= Speaker of the Parliament of Åland =

Government post of territory of Finland

- Ålands lagtings talman
- Flag of Åland
- Incumbent; Ingrid Zetterman since 3 November 2023
- Member of: Parliament of Åland
- Formation: 9 June 1922
- First holder: Julius Sundblom

List of speakers of the Parliament of Åland.

== Speakers ==
^{No.}	Name	Portrait	Party	Took office	Left office	^{Refs.}
1	Julius Sundblom			9 June 1922	23 August 1945	
2	Johannes Holmberg			1945	1945	
3	Hugo Johansson			1 January 1946	31 December 1954	
4	Thorvald Eriksson			1 November 1955	31 October 1971	
5	Alarik Häggblom			1 November 1971	1 May 1972	
6	Folke Woivalin		Åland Centre	2 May 1972	31 October 1978	
7	Nils Dahlman			1 November 1978	31 October 1979	
8	Olof Jansson			1 November 1979	31 October 1983	
9	Sune Carlsson			1 November 1983	31 October 1987	
8	Olof Jansson			1 November 1987	21 March 1994	
10	Roger Jansson		Freeminded Co-operation	23 March 1994	22 November 1995	
11	Ragnar Erlandsson		Åland Centre	27 November 1995	31 October 1999	
12	Sune Eriksson		Liberals for Åland	1 November 1999	31 October 2000	
11	Ragnar Erlandsson		Åland Centre	1 November 2000	31 October 2001	
13	Viveka Eriksson		Liberals for Åland	1 November 2001	31 October 2005	
14	Barbro Sundback		Åland Social Democrats	1 November 2005	31 October 2007	
15	Gunnar Jansson		Liberals for Åland	1 November 2007	3 December 2007	
16	Roger Nordlund		Åland Centre	3 December 2007	25 November 2011	
17	Britt Lundberg		Åland Centre	28 November 2011	31 October 2015	
18	Gun-Mari Lindholm		Moderate Coalition for Åland	2 November 2015	2 December 2015	
19	Johan Ehn		Moderate Coalition for Åland	1 December 2015	3 November 2017	
18	Gun-Mari Lindholm		Moderate Coalition for Åland	2017	2019	
16	Roger Nordlund		Åland Centre	4 November 2019	2 November 2020	
20	Bert Häggblom		Non-aligned Coalition	2 November 2020	31 October 2023	
21	Ingrid Zetterman		Liberals for Åland	3 November 2023		
22	Jörgen Pettersson		Åland Centre	3 November 2023		
