= 1995 Finnish parliamentary election =

← 1991	19 March 1995	1999 →
- All 200 seats in the Eduskunta; 101 seats needed for a majority
- Turnout: 68.58%
Party	Leader	Vote %	Seats	+/–
SDP	Paavo Lipponen	28.25	63	+15
Centre	Esko Aho	19.85	44	−11
National Coalition	Sauli Niinistö	17.89	39	−1
Left Alliance	Claes Andersson	11.16	22	+3
Green	Pekka Haavisto	6.52	9	−1
RKP	Ole Norrback	5.14	11	0
Christian League	Toimi Kankaanniemi	2.96	7	−1
Young Finns	Risto E. J. Penttilä	2.81	2	New
Rural Party	Raimo Vistbacka	1.30	1	−6
Ecological Greens	Veltto Virtanen	0.28	1	New
Liberals for Åland	Gunnar Jansson	0.22	1	0
This lists parties that won seats. See the complete results below.
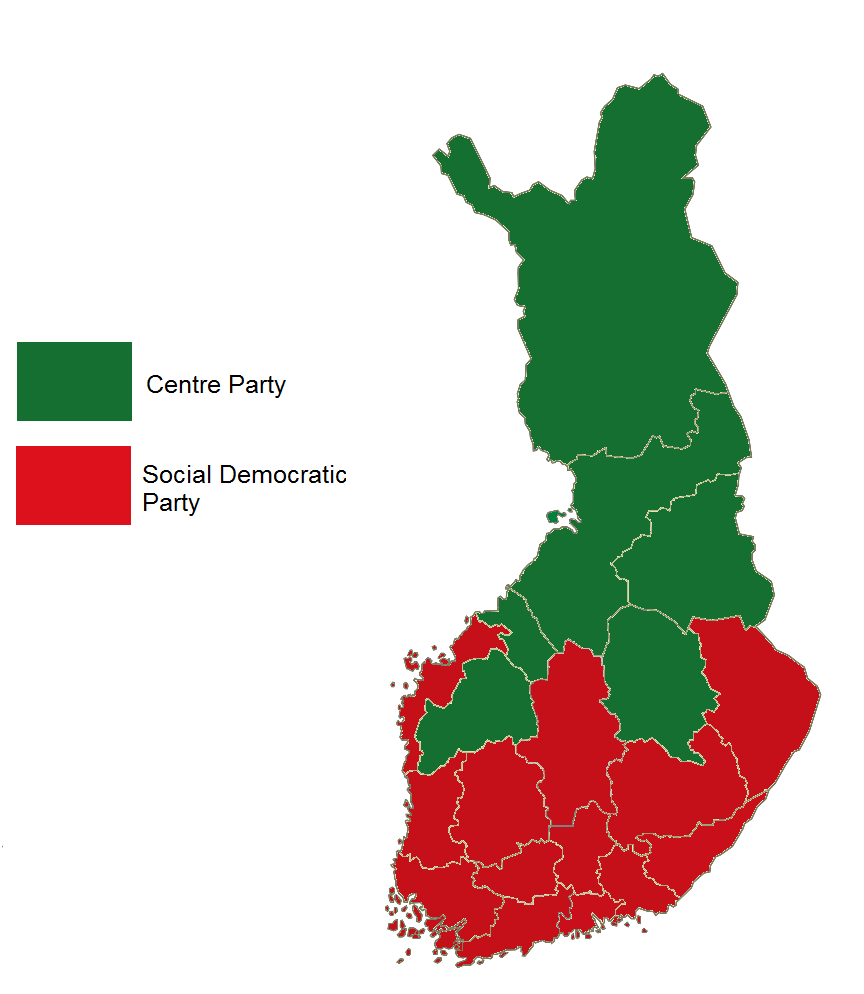
Most voted-for party by region
Prime Minister before	Prime Minister after
Esko Aho; Centre	Paavo Lipponen; SDP

Parliamentary elections were held in Finland on 19 March 1995.

The Social Democratic Party (SDP) achieved the best result of any party since World War II, winning 63 of the 200 seats in the Eduskunta and defeating the incumbent centre-right coalition led by the Centre Party. The result was attributed to the government's unpopular austerity policies as well as lingering effects of the early 1990s recession.

After the election, a five party "Rainbow Coalition" was formed, between the SDP, National Coalition Party, Left Alliance, Swedish People's Party and the Green League, with SDP leader Paavo Lipponen appointed Prime Minister.

== Results ==
Party	Votes	%	Seats	+/–
Social Democratic Party	785,637	28.25	63	+15
Centre Party	552,003	19.85	44	–11
National Coalition Party	497,624	17.89	39	–1
Left Alliance	310,340	11.16	22	+3
Green League	181,198	6.52	9	–1
Swedish People's Party	142,874	5.14	11	0
Finnish Christian League	82,311	2.96	7	–1
Young Finns	78,066	2.81	2	New
Finnish Rural Party	36,185	1.30	1	–6
Alliance for Free Finland	28,067	1.01	0	New
Liberal People's Party	16,247	0.58	0	–1
Women's Party	7,919	0.28	0	0
Ecological Party the Greens	7,865	0.28	1	0
Natural Law Party	6,819	0.25	0	New
Liberals for Åland	6,038	0.22	1	0
Pensioners for People	5,124	0.18	0	0
Communist Workers' Party – For Peace and Socialism	4,784	0.17	0	0
Pensioners' Party	3,974	0.14	0	0
Borgerlig samlingslista (C–FS–Ob)	2,958	0.11	0	0
Joint Responsibility Party	1,706	0.06	0	0
Åland Social Democrats	909	0.03	0	0
Others	22,273	0.80	0	–
Total	2,780,921	100.00	200	0
Valid votes	2,780,921	99.19		
Invalid/blank votes	22,681	0.81		
Total votes	2,803,602	100.00		
Registered voters/turnout	4,088,358	68.58		
Source: Tilastokeskus, ASUB

=== By electoral district ===
Electoral district	Total seats	Seats won										
Electoral district	Total seats	SDP	Kesk	Kok	Vas	RKP	Vihr	SKL	Nuor	SMP	EKO	L
Åland	1											1
Central Finland	10	4	3	1	1			1				
Häme	13	5	2	4	1			1				
Helsinki	19	6		5	2	2	3		1			
Kymi	13	5	2	3	1		1	1				
Lapland	8	1	4	1	2							
North Karelia	7	4	2	1								
North Savo	10	3	3	1	2			1				
Oulu	18	3	9	2	3		1					
Pirkanmaa	16	6	2	4	2		1				1	
Satakunta	11	4	3	2	2							
South Savo	8	3	3	1				1				
Uusimaa	31	11	2	7	3	4	2	1	1			
Vaasa	18	3	6	2	1	4		1		1		
Varsinais-Suomi	17	5	3	5	2	1	1					
Total	200	63	44	39	22	11	9	7	2	1	1	1
Source: Statistics Finland

=== By region ===
Province	Social Democratic	Centre	National Coalition	Left Alliance	Green League	Swedish People's	Christian League	Young Finns	Rural Party	Alliance	Liberal People's	Electorate	Votes	Valid	Invalid
South Savo	31,890	26,559	13,841	3,082	4,899	0	4,157	1,076	3,753	1,300	123	135,397	92,275	91,384	891
North Savo	32,905	42,915	16,674	21,203	7,369	0	4,364	2,474	2,877	1,629	274	199,660	134,227	133,259	968
North Karelia	36,839	25,251	11,714	5,065	4,134	0	6,226	708	1,868	717	224	135,731	94,191	93,539	652
Kainuu	6,724	16,366	4,935	12,709	2,109	0	1,084	471	388	1,614	1,031	72,939	48,598	48,118	480
Uusimaa	192,889	36,779	143,737	61,533	72,789	64,218	12,067	37,658	2,949	7,497	2,084	909,997	658,294	652,716	5,578
Eastern Uusimaa	14,097	3,954	4,814	2,649	2,299	15,507	536	1,132	193	320	51	65,300	47,086	46,697	389
Southwest Finland	67,865	36,880	57,235	32,634	14,320	11,017	4,559	10,665	2,624	2,290	487	334,154	247,761	245,994	1,767
Kanta-Häme	33,434	15,617	22,893	8,229	5,696	0	3,655	1,317	423	505	85	127,549	94,859	93,925	934
Päijät-Häme	33,601	13,274	29,766	9,873	5,725	109	4,853	2,400	1,633	1,016	468	153,856	104,974	104,040	934
Kymenlaakso	43,682	15,851	23,889	9,442	7,111	0	3,352	1,290	229	953	262	152,169	108,372	107,559	813
South Karelia	27,828	18,919	15,752	2,681	5,190	0	2,455	1,164	579	653	784	110,296	77,004	76,357	647
Central Finland	43,916	35,886	18,467	17,947	8,427	0	9,724	2,361	943	1,212	475	197,959	141,369	140,306	1,063
Southern Ostrobothnia	18,168	57,084	19,671	4,940	3,419	254	3,359	924	5,762	544	113	152,617	115,865	115,171	694
Ostrobothnia	19,876	9,966	6,765	7,407	1,965	47,267	2,892	823	677	476	533	131,511	99,754	99,100	654
Satakunta	46,996	29,443	26,692	21,057	4,395	1	4,700	1,111	3,091	604	929	191,292	142,330	141,164	1,166
Pirkanmaa	73,178	33,646	48,750	33,277	15,790	0	6,392	5,613	3,395	2,278	3,399	333,840	242,226	240,209	2,017
Central Ostrobothnia	7,429	17,106	2,539	2,549	1,184	2,862	3,533	841	1,288	320	99	53,280	40,414	40,080	334
Northern Ostrobothniaa	30,798	72,673	17,314	24,898	11,008	0	2,547	4,547	2,384	3,487	4,471	254,316	182,207	180,758	1,449
Lapland	20,333	42,590	9,779	27,675	2,558	0	1,545	1,165	995	537	265	151,860	109,448	108,397	1,051
Åland	0	0	0	0	0	0	0	0	0	0	0	18,938	9,874	9,799	
Source: European Election Database
