= Igge Holmberg =

Ålandic politician (1966–2020)

Member of the Parliament of Åland
- In office 1 November 2011 – 31 October 2019

Personal details
- Born: 1966 Mariehamn
- Died: 27 July 2020 (aged 54)
- Party: Social Democrats

Mikael ”Igge” Holmberg (1966 – 27 July 2020) was an Ålandic politician and member of the Parliament of Åland, the regional legislature of Åland, an autonomous region of Finland. A social democrat, he was a member of the legislature from November 2011 to October 2019.

== Political career ==
He was elected to the municipal council in Mariehamn in 2007 and served as the Social Democrats group leader on the council. He was then a member of the Parliament of Åland from the social democrats from November 2011 to october 2019. He was chairman of the Åland delegation in the Baltic Sea cooperation BSPC. During his time in parliament, he was known for his radical views and statements, particularly in 2012, calling the unborn Princess Estelle, Duchess of Östergötland a "parasite". In 2017 he also became known for posting a picture of himself with an AK-47 and stating "voice of the people".

== Personal life ==
Holmberg was born in 1966 in Mariehamn. He held various jobs including sign language interpreter and an assistant for schoolchildren with problems. While holding office, he was the secretary of the Åland Literature Association. In 2013 he was convicted of minor assault inside of the Eckerökollektivet treatment center's office in April 2011, although it was not considered punishable because it was found he was provoked by the 15-year-old boy after the boy threatened another woman in the office. This eventually led to the opposition parties Liberalerna and Future of Åland attempting to get him replaced, which did not succeed.

A tumour was discovered in one of Holmberg's kidneys in April 2019. The tumour was removed but the cancer had spread. He died on 27 July 2020 aged 54.

== Electoral history ==
Electoral history of Igge Holmberg
Election	Constituency	Party	Votes	Result
2007 Ålandic legislative	Åland	Åland Social Democrats	68	Not elected
2007 municipal	Mariehamn	Åland Social Democrats	65	Elected
2011 Ålandic legislative	Åland	Åland Social Democrats	267	Elected
2011 municipal	Mariehamn	Åland Social Democrats	188	Elected
2015 Ålandic legislative	Åland	Åland Social Democrats	73	Elected
2015 municipal	Mariehamn	Åland Social Democrats	68	Elected
2019 Ålandic legislative	Åland	Åland Social Democrats	48	Not elected
