= 1999 Finnish parliamentary election =

- 21 March 1999

All 200 seats in Parliament 101 seats needed for a majority
- Registered: 4,152,430
- Turnout: 65.27% (▼3.31pp)
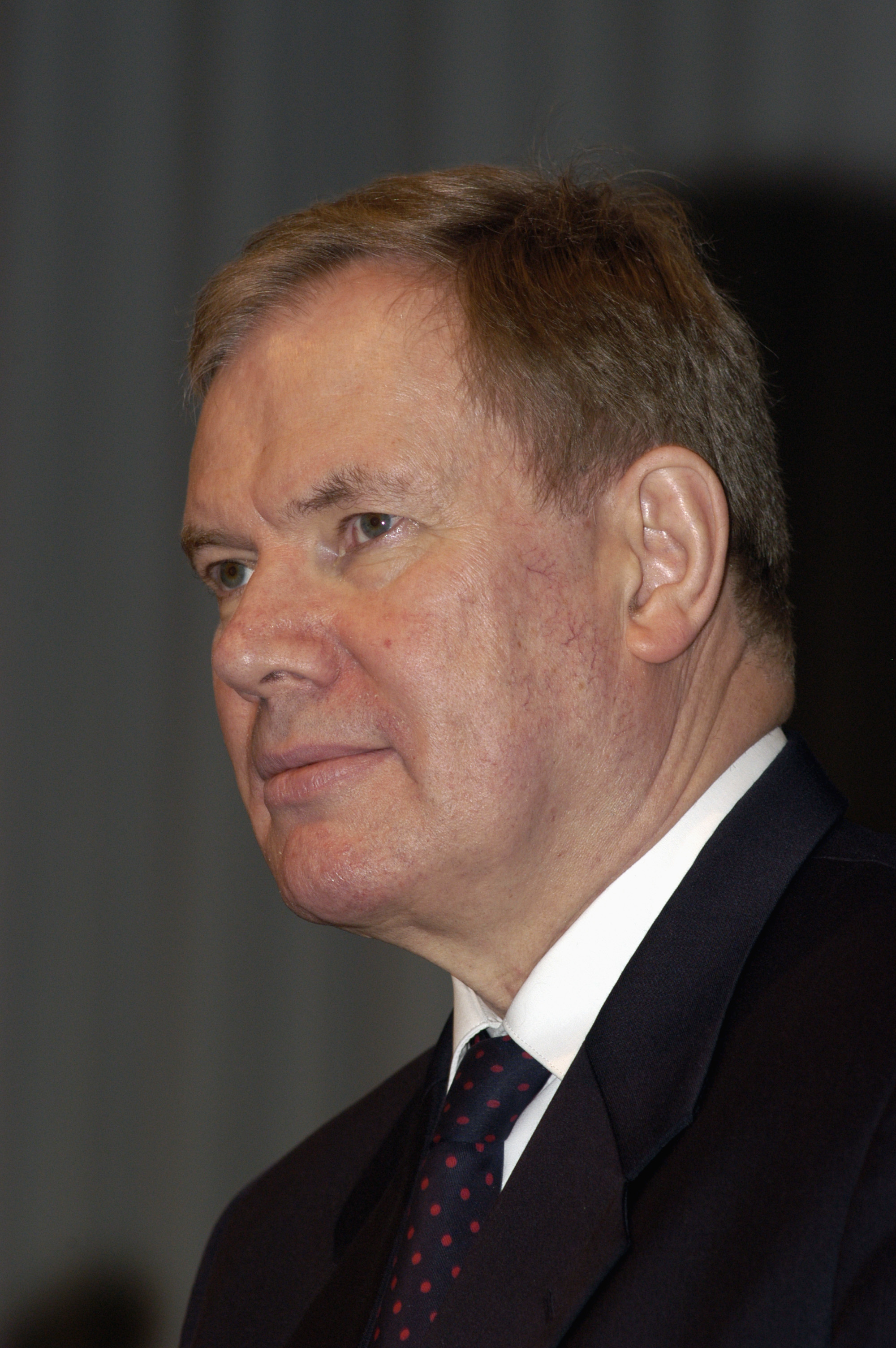

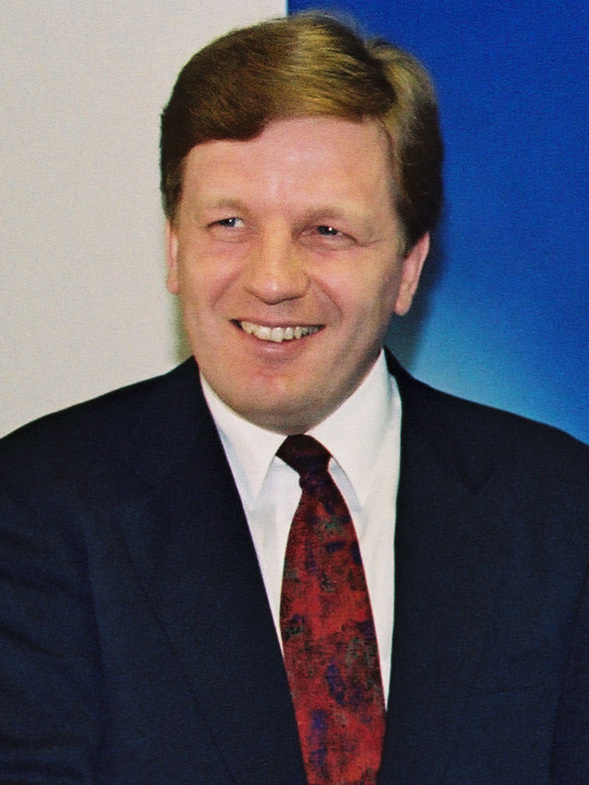

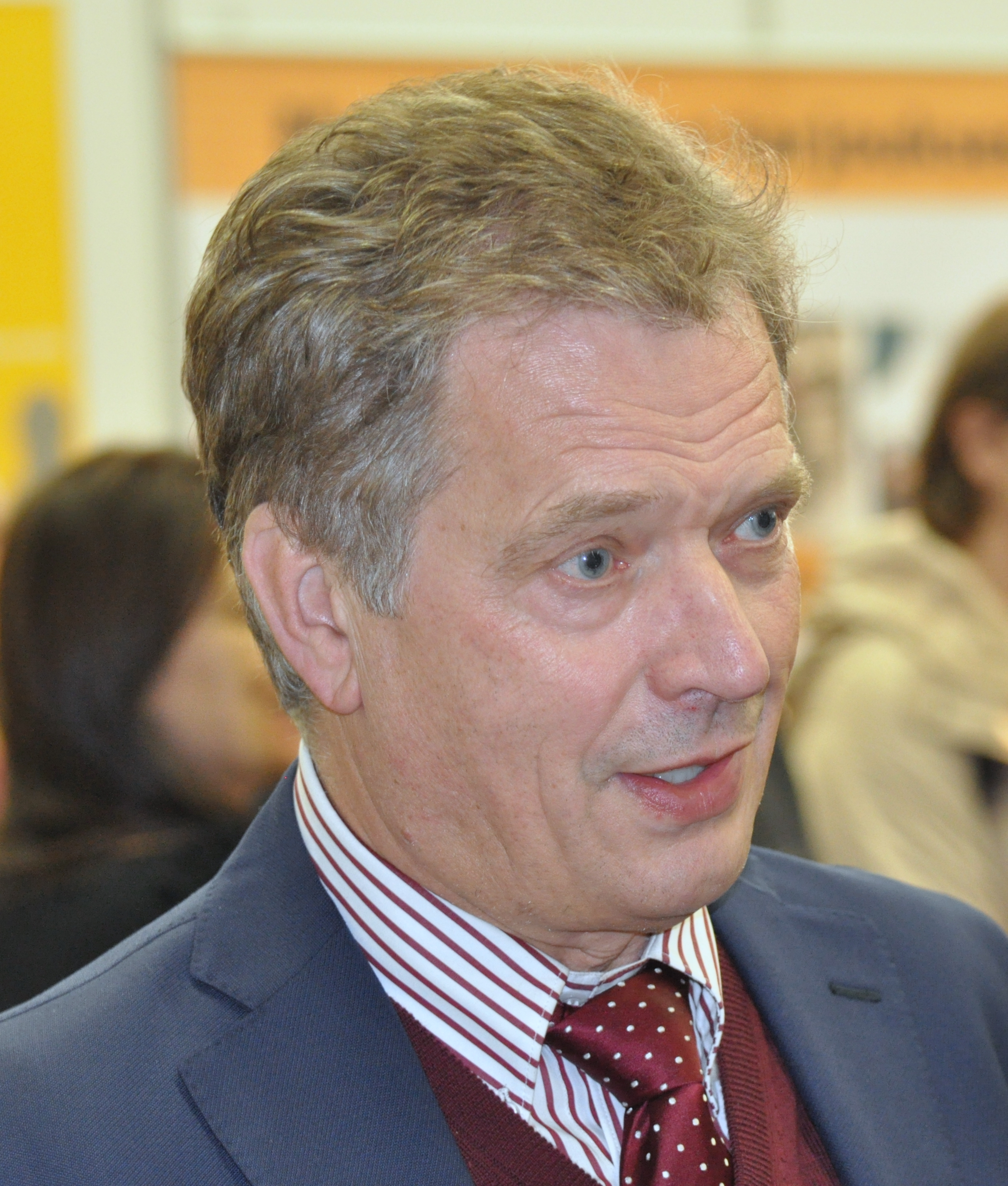

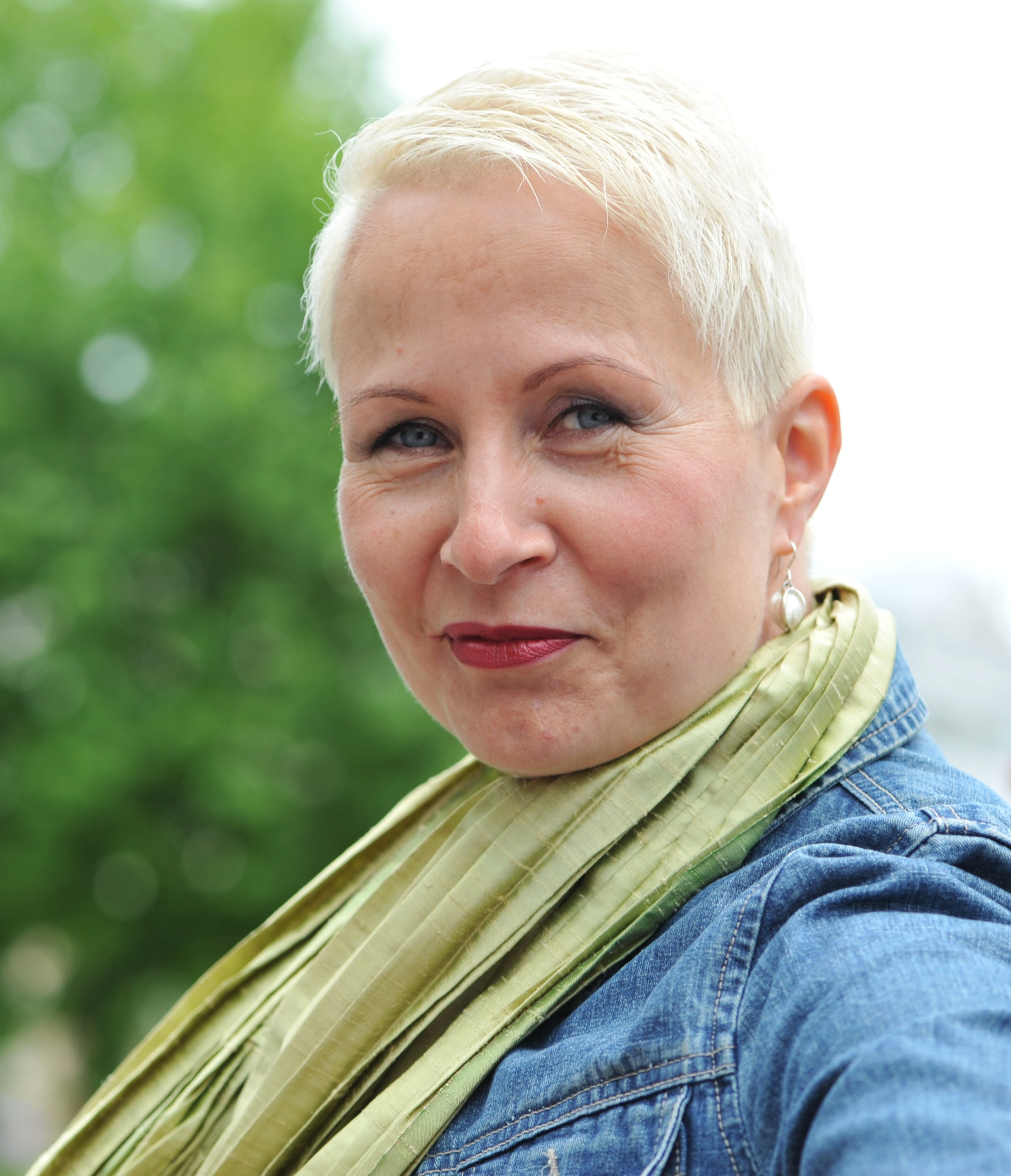

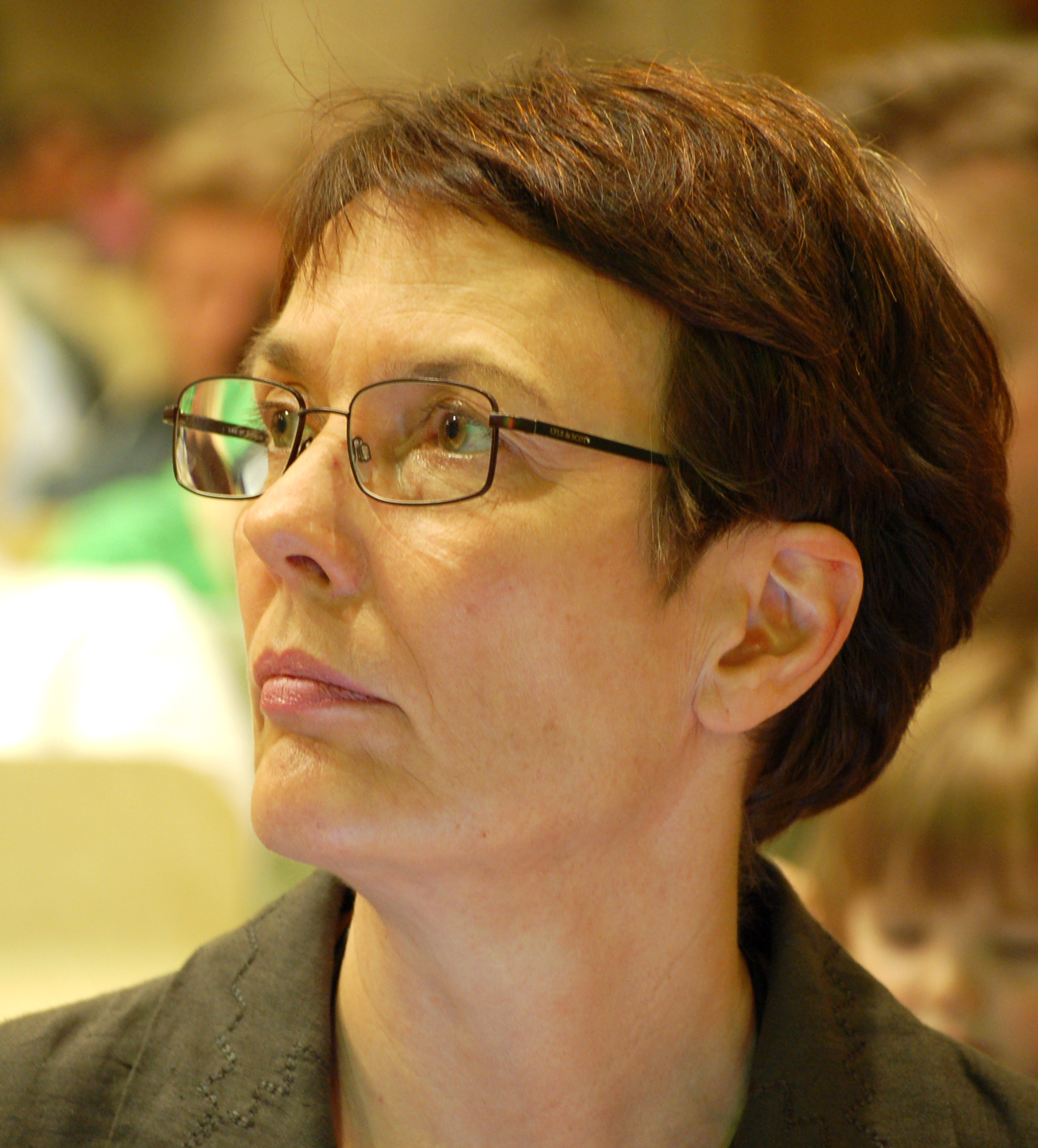

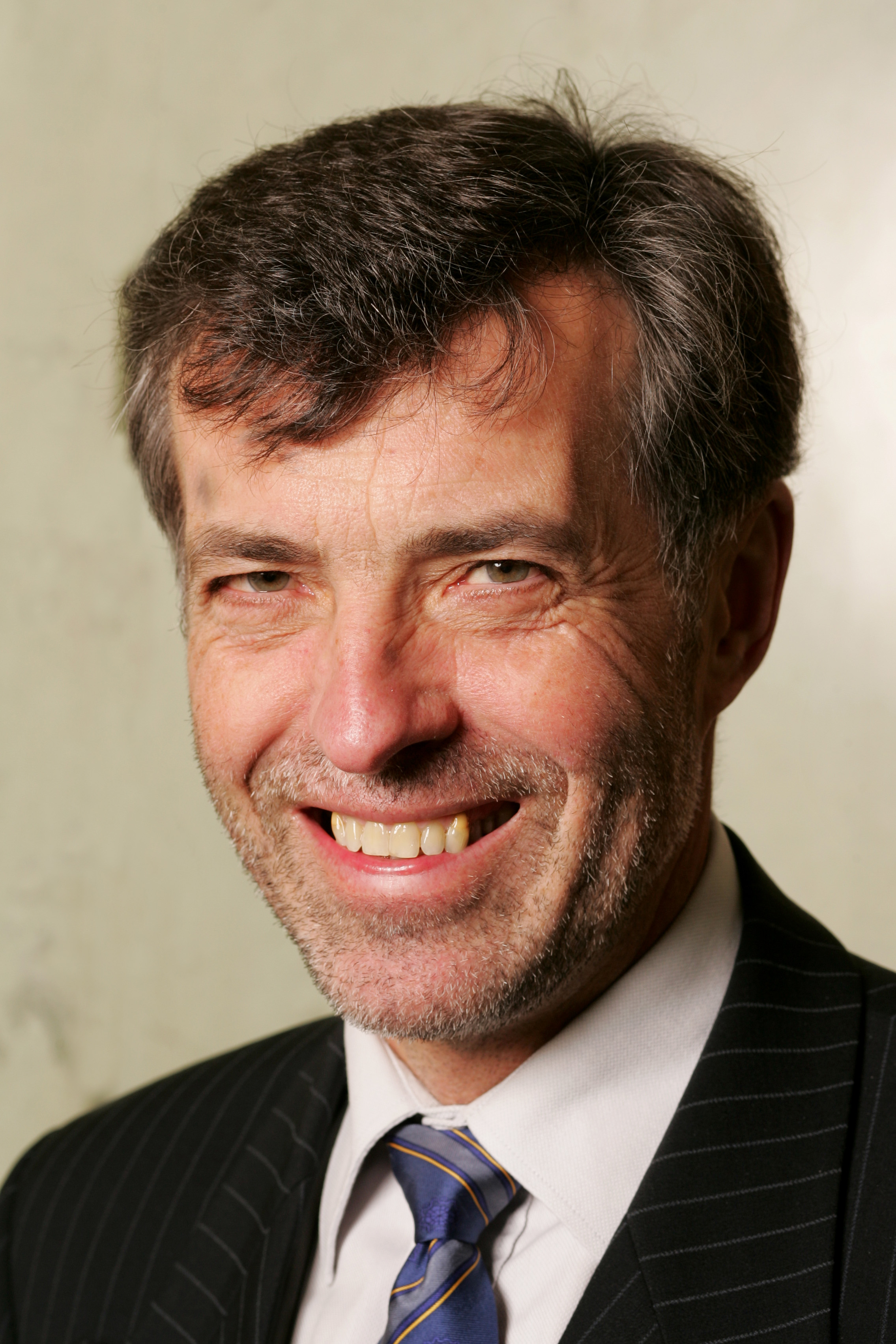

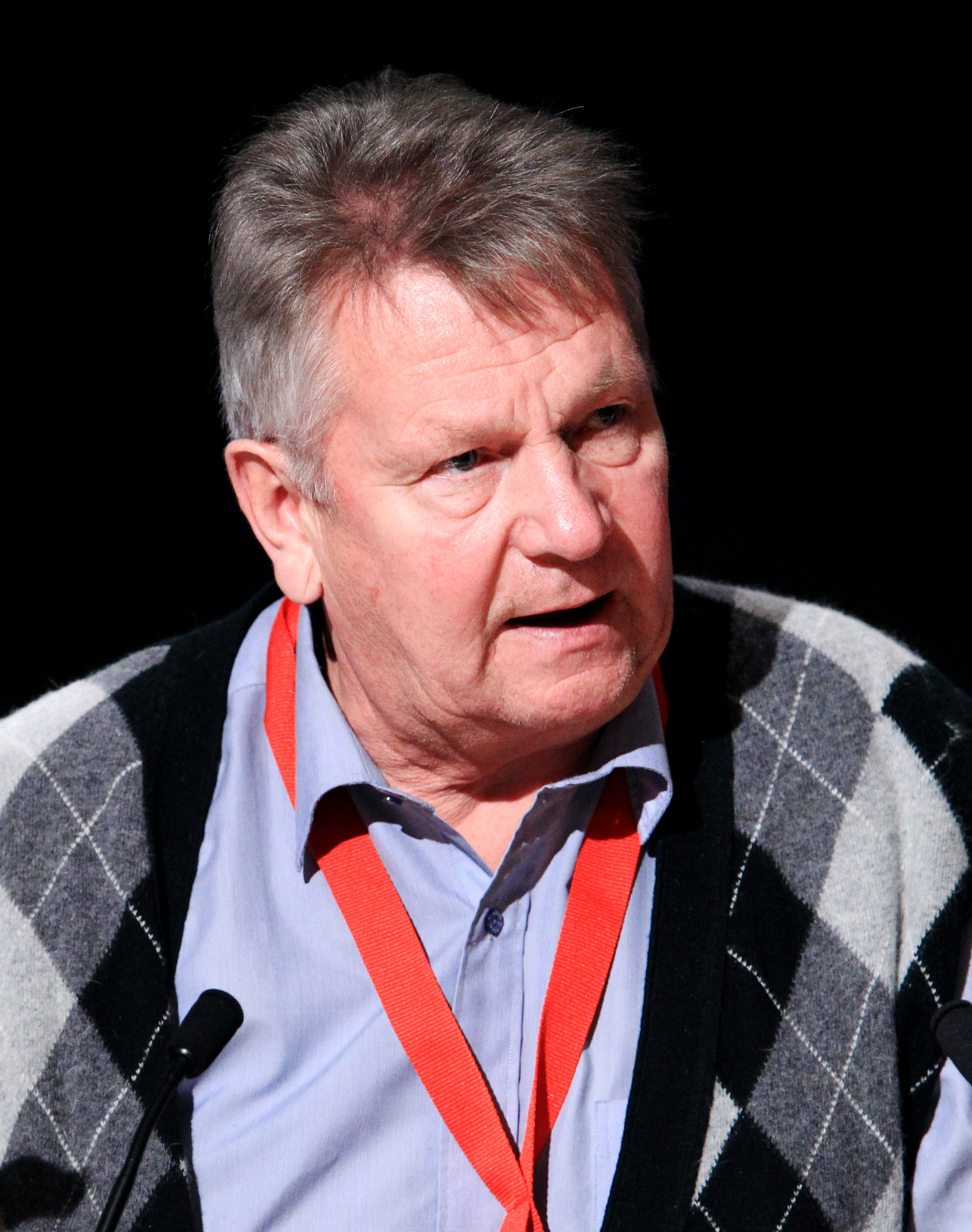

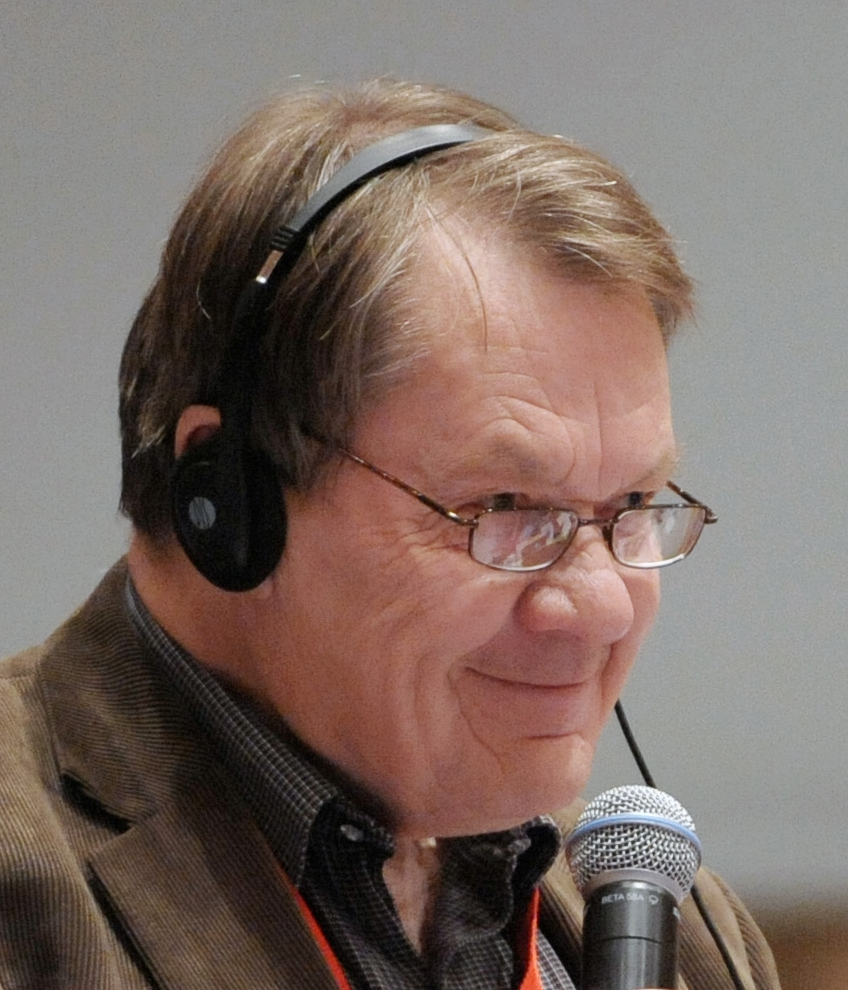

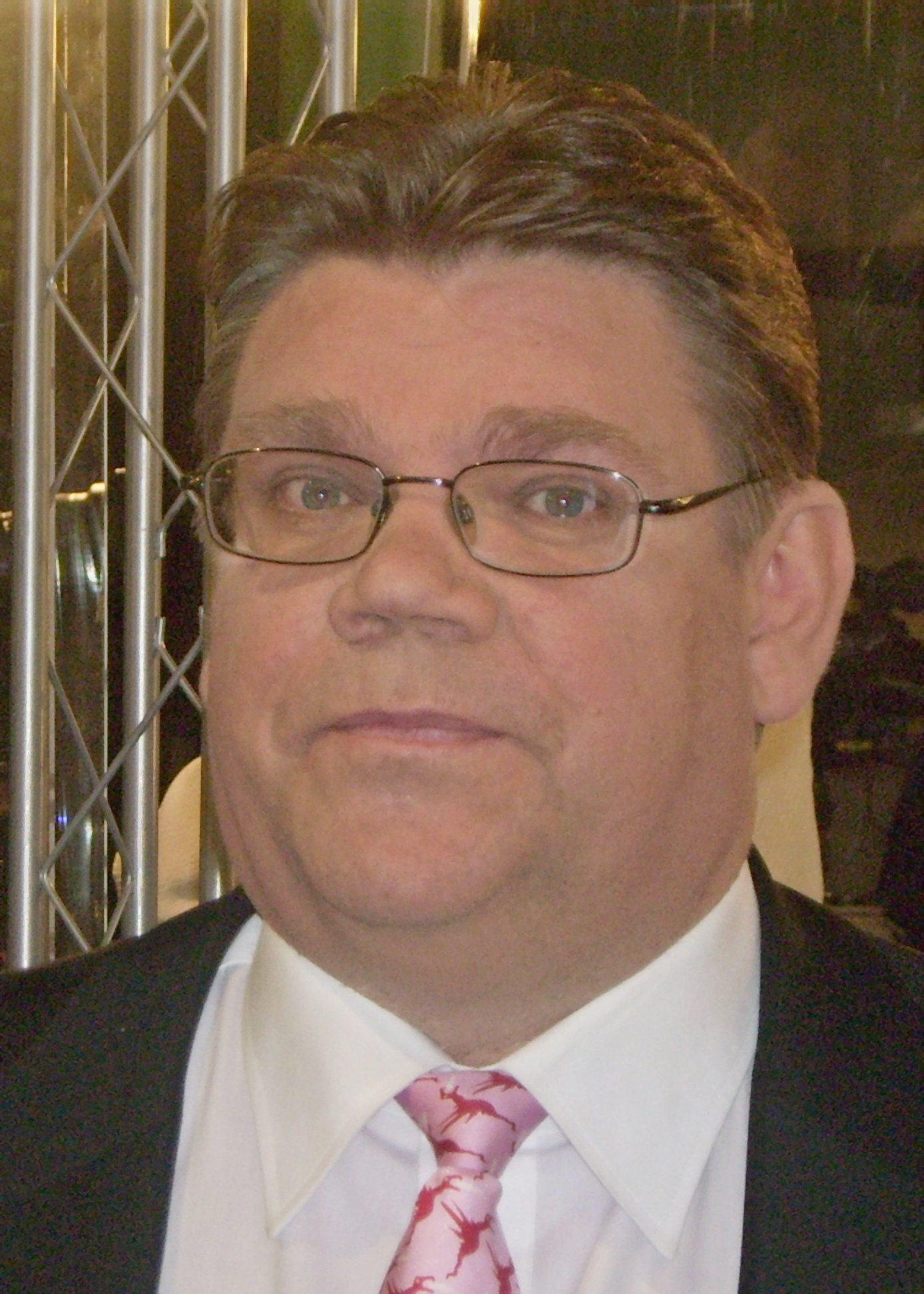
	First party	Second party	Third party
Leader	Paavo Lipponen	Esko Aho	Sauli Niinistö
Party	SDP	Centre	National Coalition
Last election	63 seats, 28.3%	44 seats, 19.9%	39 seats, 17.9%
Seats won	51	48	46
Seat change	▼12	▲4	▲7
Popular vote	612,963	600,592	563,835
Percentage	22.9%	22.4%	21.0%
Swing	▼5.4pp	▲2.6pp	▲3.1pp
	Fourth party	Fifth party	Sixth party
Leader	Suvi-Anne Siimes	Satu Hassi	Jan-Erik Enestam
Party	Left Alliance	Green	RKP
Last election	22 seats, 11.2%	9 seats, 6.5%	11 seats, 5.1%
Seats won	20	11	11
Seat change	▼2	▲2	Steady
Popular vote	291,675	194,846	137,330
Percentage	10.9%	7.3%	5.1%
Swing	▼0.3pp	▲0.8pp	Steady
	Seventh party	Eighth party	Ninth party
Leader	Bjarne Kallis	Risto Kuisma	Timo Soini
Party	Christian League	Reform	Finns
Last election	7 seats, 3.0%	New party	1 seat, 1.3% (SMP)
Seats won	10	1	1
Seat change	▲3	▲1	Steady
Popular vote	111,835	28,549	26,440
Percentage	4.2%	1.1%	1.0%
Swing	▲1.1pp	▲1.1pp	▼0.3pp
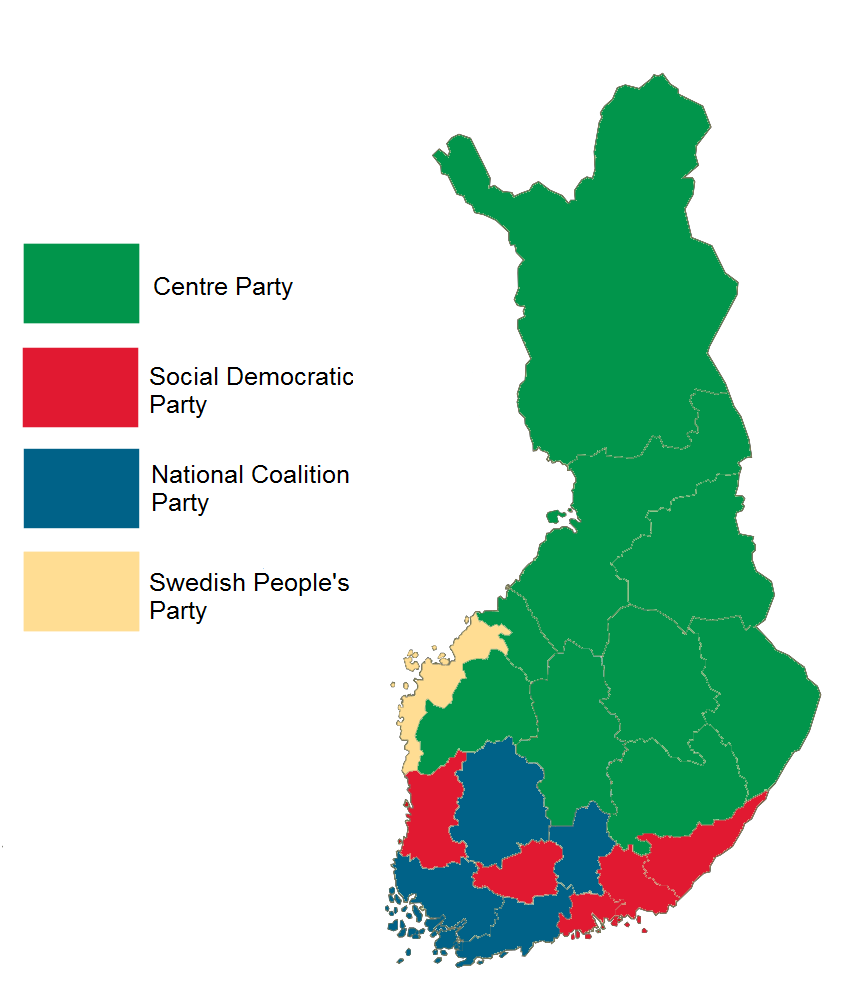
Prime Minister before election
Paavo Lipponen
SDP
Prime Minister after election
Paavo Lipponen
SDP

Parliamentary elections were held in Finland on 21 March 1999. Despite suffering significant losses, the Social Democratic Party (SDP) remained the largest party of the Eduskunta and Paavo Lipponen remained Prime Minister.

== Background ==
Prime Minister Paavo Lipponen's five-party "rainbow government" consisting of the SDP, National Coalition Party, Left Alliance, Swedish People's Party and the Green League had been in power since April 1995. It had managed to keep Finland's economy growing, to reduce the state's budget deficit and to create jobs, although it had failed to halve the unemployment rate: in 1995, the unemployment had been 15.4% and in 1999, it still stood at 10.2%. This was, as the governing parties pointed out, still a better record than the previous centre-right government's performance; during its term between 1991 and 1995, the unemployment had risen from 6.6% to 15.4%.

== Campaign ==
The largest opposition party, the Centre Party, tried to become the largest party overall, and to re-join the government. They called for labour reform, which they claimed would make it easier for employers to hire new employees and for small enterprises to operate. Finland's largest labour unions rejected the proposed work reform, claiming that it would reduce the employees' job security and would excessively increase the employers' power. The Centrists also accused the government of not improving the Finnish economy enough, and of not slowing down sufficiently the large internal migration of Finns from the rural towns and small cities to the large economic growth centres, like the Helsinki and Tampere regions.

Several parties hired as their candidates previously non-political or only locally politically active celebrities, such as Leena Harkimo, the manager of Helsinki's ice hockey team Jokerit, Lasse Virén, a former long-distance running Olympic champion, and Anni Sinnemäki, the songwriter of pop music group Ultra Bra. Some of these celebrities got elected. After the elections, Prime Minister Lipponen formed a new government of the same five parties. Only one of those parties left the government during the parliamentary term 1999-2003: the Greens moved into the opposition in May 2002, when the Parliament approved the construction of Finland's fifth nuclear power plant.

== Results ==
Party	Votes	%	Seats	+/–
Social Democratic Party	612,963	22.86	51	−12
Centre Party	600,592	22.40	48	+4
National Coalition Party	563,835	21.03	46	+7
Left Alliance	291,675	10.88	20	−2
Green League	194,846	7.27	11	+2
Swedish People's Party	137,330	5.12	11	0
Finnish Christian League	111,835	4.17	10	+3
Reform Group	28,549	1.06	1	New
Young Finns	28,084	1.05	0	−2
Finns Party	26,440	0.99	1	New
Communist Party	20,442	0.76	0	New
Ecological Party the Greens	10,378	0.39	0	−1
Alliance for Free Finland	10,104	0.38	0	0
Liberals for Åland	5,870	0.22	1	0
Pensioners for People	5,451	0.20	0	0
Liberal People's Party	5,194	0.19	0	0
Pensioners' Party	4,481	0.17	0	0
Natural Law Party	3,903	0.15	0	0
Åland Centre–Freeminded–Non-aligned	3,678	0.14	0	0
Communist Workers' Party – For Peace and Socialism	3,455	0.13	0	0
Åland Social Democrats	924	0.03	0	0
Others	11,262	0.42	0	–
Total	2,681,291	100.00	200	0
Valid votes	2,681,291	98.94		
Invalid/blank votes	28,804	1.06		
Total votes	2,710,095	100.00		
Registered voters/turnout	4,152,430	65.27		
Source: Tilastokeskus, ASUB

=== By electoral district ===
Electoral district	Total seats	Seats won									
Electoral district	Total seats	SDP	Kesk	Kok	Vas	Vihr	RKP	SKL	Rem	PS	L
Åland	1										1
Central Finland	10	3	4	1	1			1			
Häme	13	4	2	4	1	1		1			
Helsinki	20	5	1	7	1	4	2				
Kymi	13	5	3	3	1			1			
Lapland	8	1	4	1	2						
North Karelia	7	4	2	1							
North Savo	10	2	4	2	1			1			
Oulu	18	2	9	2	3	1		1			
Pirkanmaa	16	4	2	5	3	1		1			
Satakunta	10	3	2	2	2			1			
South Savo	8	3	3	2							
Uusimaa	32	8	3	9	3	3	4	1	1		
Vaasa	17	3	6	2			4	1		1	
Varsinais-Suomi	17	4	3	5	2	1	1	1			
Total	200	51	48	46	20	11	11	10	1	1	1
Source: Statistics Finland

=== By region ===
Province	Social Democratic	Centre	National Coalition	Left Alliance	Green League	Swedish People's	Christian League	Reform Group	Young Finns	True Finns	Communist	Electorate	Votes	Valid	Invalid
South Savo	26,029	30,231	14,778	2,284	4,195	0	5,137	538	0	578	168	132,335	85,641	84,803	1,019
North Savo	24,889	45,226	20,323	17,731	5,861	0	5,749	571	747	3,467	1,140	198,391	127,436	126,611	1,143
Northern Karelia	32,467	26,726	9,923	4,457	3,724	0	5,579	308	2,162	1,392	688	133,389	88,825	88,243	790
Kainuu	4,010	20,593	4,515	12,150	1,192	0	919	450	201	332	583	70,684	46,600	46,201	532
Uusimaa	150,585	55,513	183,700	58,354	91,819	60,281	17,903	12,342	15,909	1,258	3,831	962,873	666,338	663,813	7,536
Eastern Uusimaa	10,879	4,888	6,589	2,337	2,748	13,855	871	1,672	335	138	223	66,336	45,479	45,170	527
Southwest Finland	54,988	39,616	63,753	27,939	18,178	11,881	5,421	1,010	1,808	587	1,640	344,072	236,766	235,203	2,465
Kanta-Häme	24,866	16,310	20,803	6,770	5,808	0	8,514	556	487	162	571	127,728	87,776	86,783	1,184
Päijät-Häme	26,374	15,569	27,481	9,400	5,933	36	6,923	1,027	313	679	591	153,108	97,463	96,656	1,134
Kymenlaakso	34,448	19,219	24,931	8,311	5,456	0	5,049	584	0	178	657	149,271	99,978	99,412	1,068
South Karelia	22,172	19,433	17,415	2,469	3,751	0	4,175	403	0	465	572	108,576	71,958	71,337	849
Central Finland	33,744	41,459	20,223	16,816	7,116	247	10,875	849	1,768	300	1,082	202,050	136,420	135,455	1,461
Southern Ostrobothnia	15,041	52,128	21,711	3,821	1,944	192	4,063	574	0	8,402	272	150,517	110,174	109,683	807
Ostrobothnia	15,051	9,741	8,809	6,230	2,369	47,334	4,694	241	0	1,371	334	131,979	96,952	96,955	781
Satakunta	36,722	30,587	27,943	20,415	4,044	10	6,084	823	3	852	478	188,315	130,669	129,518	1,476
Pirkanmaa	55,569	36,278	56,918	36,800	16,123	0	10,817	2,073	3,117	1,385	2,927	343,944	236,491	234,823	2,487
Central Ostrobothnia	6,090	16,032	3,288	1,822	744	3,208	4,628	839	0	1,701	144	53,399	39,080	38,906	376
Northern Ostrobothnia	25,164	76,611	20,376	25,476	11,994	0	3,119	3,053	1,234	2,635	4,136	263,201	178,469	177,498	1,898
Lapland	13,875	44,432	10,356	28,093	1,847	286	1,315	636	0	558	405	148,965	103,754	103,749	1,122
Åland	0	0	0	0	0	0	0	0	0	0	0	19,132	10,465	10,472	149
Source: European Election Database
