= List of political parties in Åland =

Åland has a multi-party system with numerous political parties, in which a party often has no chance of gaining power alone, and parties must work with each other to form coalition governments.

== Parties with elected representation at the national or international level ==
Party	2023 MPs	Leader	Ideology	Affiliations
Liberals for Åland; Liberalerna på Åland	9 / 30	Katrin Sjögren	Liberalism	European: ALDE; Nordic: Centre
Åland Centre; Åländsk Center	7 / 30	Veronica Thörnroos	Centrism; Agrarianism	European: ALDE; Nordic: Centre
Non-aligned Coalition; Obunden Samling	5 / 30	Marcus Måtar	Conservatism; Sovereigntism	Nordic: Conservative
Moderate Coalition for Åland; Moderat Samling för Åland	4 / 30	Wille Valve	Liberal conservatism	European: ALDE; Nordic: Conservative
Åland Social Democrats; Ålands Socialdemokrater	4 / 30	Camilla Gunell	Social democracy	Nordic: SAMAK, Social Democratic
Sustainable Initiative; Hållbart Initiativ	2 / 30	Alfons Röblom; Erica Scott	Green politics	European: EGP; Nordic: Centre
Future of Åland; Ålands Framtid	0 / 30	Peggy Eriksson	Cultural conservatism Souverainism	European: EFA; Nordic: Centre
Ålandic Democracy; Åländsk Demokrati	0 / 30	Stephan Toivonen	National conservatism	

== Former parties ==
- Åland Progress Group (Ålands Framstegsgrupp)
- Ålandic Left (Åländsk Vänster)
- Free Åland (Fria Åland)
- Freeminded Co-operation (Frisinnad Samverkan)
- Greens on Åland (Gröna på Åland)
- Hut Group (Hutgruppen)

== See also ==
- Politics of Åland
- List of political parties by country
