= Elisabeth Nauclér =

Åland politician (born 1952)

Elisabeth Nauclér (born 7 March 1952 in Eda Municipality) is a Swedish-born Finnish independent politician and jurist. Naucler was the single member of parliament for the autonomous region of Åland in the Parliament of Finland. She sat with the mainland's Swedish People's Party in the parliament. In 2015 elections she was replaced by Mats Löfström. Nauclér's father was from Värmland in Sweden, and her mother was Norwegian.

Nauclér earned her degree in law in Uppsala University, and moved to Åland, Finland, with her Finnish husband. She began her career in the provincial administration of Åland in 1979 and continued until 2006. She was elected to the Parliament of Finland in the election of 2011 from the centre-right alliance Borgerlig allians (C, FS, Lib., Ob.).

== See also ==
- First women lawyers around the world

Assembly seats
Preceded by Roger Jansson	Member of Finnish Parliament for Åland; 2007–2015	Succeeded by Mats Löfström
