= 1975 Ålandic legislative election =

Elections in the Åland province of Finland

Legislative elections were held in Åland on 20 October 1975 to elect members of the Landstinget. The 30 members were elected for a four-year term by proportional representation.

There were apparentments between Åland Social Democrats and ÅSU; Liberals, Freeminded Co-operation and Samlad Åländsk Ungdom; and between FS–framsteg and Åländska Förbundet.

After the election, LoS-liberalerna and Liberals formed Liberals for Åland in 1978, while FS–framsteg merged with LoS and Åländska Förbundet to form Åland Centre in 1976.

== Results ==
Party	Votes	%	Seats
Landsbygdens och skargardens valforbund	2,832	29.82	9
Landsbygdens och skargardens valforbund–liberalerna	2,055	21.64	7
Åland Social Democrats	1,371	14.44	5
Freeminded Co-operation	1,027	10.82	3
Liberals for Åland	782	8.24	3
Åländska Förbundet	587	6.18	2
Frisinnad Samverkan–framsteg	383	4.03	1
Ålands socialdemokratiska unga	181	1.91	0
Ray Söderholm	180	1.90	0
Samlad Åländsk Ungdom	97	1.02	0
Write-in candidate	1	0.01	0
Total	9,496	100.00	30
Valid votes	9,496	98.01	
Invalid/blank votes	193	1.99	
Total votes	9,689	100.00	
Registered voters/turnout	15,413	62.86	
Source: Valstatistik
