= 1991 Ålandic legislative election =

← 1987	20 October 1991	1995 →
- All 30 seats in the Parliament of Åland; 16 seats needed for a majority
- Turnout: 62.37% (▼1.97 pp)
Party	Leader	Vote %	Seats	+/–
Åland Centre	Ragnar Erlandsson	30.16	10	+1
Liberals for Åland	Sune Eriksson	22.90	7	−1
Freeminded Co-op		19.81	6	+1
Social Democrats		14.55	4	0
Non-aligned Coalition		9.74	3	+1
This lists parties that won seats. See the complete results below.
Lantråd before	Lantråd after
Sune Eriksson; Liberals for Åland	Ragnar Erlandsson; Åland Centre

Legislative elections were held in Åland on 20 October 1991 to elect members of the Landstinget. The 30 members were elected for a four-year term by proportional representation.

Following the elections, the previous government of the Åland Centre, Liberals for Åland and Freeminded Co-operation parties, was replaced by one formed of the Åland Centre, Freeminded Co-operation and Åland Social Democrats.

== Results ==
Party	Votes	%	Seats	+/–
Åland Centre	3,242	30.16	10	+1
Liberals for Åland	2,462	22.90	7	–1
Freeminded Co-operation	2,130	19.81	6	+1
Åland Social Democrats	1,564	14.55	4	0
Non-aligned Coalition	1,047	9.74	3	+1
Greens on Åland	306	2.85	0	–2
Total	10,751	100.00	30	0
Valid votes	10,751	97.19		
Invalid/blank votes	311	2.81		
Total votes	11,062	100.00		
Registered voters/turnout	17,737	62.37		
Source: ASUB
