= 1987 Ålandic legislative election =

← 1983	18 October 1987	1991 →
- All 30 seats in the Parliament of Åland; 16 seats needed for a majority
- Turnout: 64.34% (▼0.07 pp)
Party	Leader	Vote %	Seats	+/–
Åland Centre	Folke Woivalin	28.73	9	−2
Liberals for Åland	Sune Eriksson	23.73	8	−1
Freeminded Co-op		17.25	5	0
Social Democrats		13.97	4	−1
Non-aligned Coalition		7.04	2	New
Greens on Åland	Rauli Lehtinen	6.65	2	New
This lists parties that won seats. See the complete results below.
Lantråd before	Lantråd after
Folke Woivalin; Åland Centre	Sune Eriksson; Liberals for Åland

Legislative elections were held in Åland on 18 October 1987 to elect members of the Landstinget. The 30 members were elected for a four-year term by proportional representation.

Three new parties participated in the elections; the conservative Non-aligned Coalition, the separatist Free Åland and the environmentalist Greens on Åland. After the next election in 1991, only the Non-Aligned Rally would still be active.

Following the elections, a change in the constitution provided for the establishment of a majority government. As a result, the Åland Centre, Liberals for Åland and Freeminded Co-operation parties formed a coalition government.

== Results ==
Party	Votes	%	Seats	+/–
Åland Centre	3,063	28.73	9	–2
Liberals for Åland	2,530	23.73	8	–1
Freeminded Co-operation	1,839	17.25	5	0
Åland Social Democrats	1,489	13.97	4	–1
Non-aligned Coalition	750	7.04	2	New
Greens on Åland	709	6.65	2	New
Free Åland	280	2.63	0	New
Total	10,660	100.00	30	0
Valid votes	10,660	97.16		
Invalid/blank votes	312	2.84		
Total votes	10,972	100.00		
Registered voters/turnout	17,053	64.34		
Source: ASUB
