= 1979 Ålandic legislative election =

Elections in the Åland province of Finland

← 1975	20 October 1979	1983 →
- All 30 seats in the Parliament of Åland; 16 seats needed for a majority
- Turnout: 60.01% (▼2.85 pp)
Party	Leader	Vote %	Seats	+/–
Åland Centre	Folke Woivalin	42.34	14	+5
Liberals for Åland		29.59	9	−1
Freeminded Co-op		13.87	4	+1
Social Democrats		12.05	3	−2
This lists parties that won seats. See the complete results below.
Lantråd before	Lantråd after
Folke Woivalin; Åland Centre	Folke Woivalin; Åland Centre

Legislative elections were held in Åland on 20 October 1979 to elect members of the Landstinget. The 30 members were elected for a four-year term by proportional representation.

The 1979 elections saw the first participation of the Åland Centre, which had formed from a loose electoral organisation known as Landsbygdens och skärgårdens valförbund (LOS); the Liberals for Åland, which had been formed by a merger of LOS-Liberalerna (itself a break-away organisation from LOS) and Mittenliberalerna; and the Ålandic Left.

== Results ==
Party	Votes	%	Seats
Åland Centre	3,954	42.34	14
Liberals for Åland	2,763	29.59	9
Freeminded Co-operation	1,295	13.87	4
Åland Social Democrats	1,125	12.05	3
Ålandic Left	202	2.16	0
Total	9,339	100.00	30
Valid votes	9,339	97.84	
Invalid/blank votes	206	2.16	
Total votes	9,545	100.00	
Registered voters/turnout	15,907	60.01	
Source: ASUB
