= Annette Holmberg-Jansson =

Finnish politician

Member of the Parliament of Åland
- In office: 2011–2019; 2023–present

Chair of Moderate Coalition for Åland
- In office 2016–2019

Personal details
- Born: March 11, 1969 (age 56); Stockholm, Sweden
- Political party: Moderate Coalition for Åland

Annette Holmberg-Jansson (born March 11, 1969) is a politician and restaurant manager who has been a Member of the Parliament of Åland since 2011 and leads the Moderate Coalition for Åland political party.

== Life ==
Holmberg-Jansson was born in 1969 in Stockholm to Swedish parents. At the age of one, she moved with her family to Åland. She is a restaurant manager and lives in Jomala.

She was elected a Member of the Parliament of Åland in 2011 and served on the Adjustment (2013–2014) and Finance (2013–2015) Committees during that four-year term. She was re-elected in 2015 to serve another four years and has been a member of the Social and Environmental Committee; she was vice-chairman of the Åland delegation in the Baltic Sea Parliamentary Conference. In November 2016, Holmberg-Jansson succeeded Johan Ehn as leader of the Moderate Coalition for Åland political party; at the party's autumn meeting, she received 30 votes compared to the contender, Marcus Clausen, who received ten (two other papers were spoilt).
