= 1995 Ålandic legislative election =

← 1991	15 October 1995	1999 →
- All 30 seats in the Parliament of Åland; 16 seats needed for a majority
- Turnout: 62.55% (▲0.18 pp)
Party	Leader	Vote %	Seats	+/–
Åland Centre	Ragnar Erlandsson	27.78	9	−1
Liberals for Åland	Sune Eriksson	26.56	8	+1
Freeminded Co-op	Roger Jansson	20.58	6	0
Social Democrats	Barbro Sundback	15.24	4	0
Non-aligned Coalition		9.84	3	0
This lists parties that won seats. See the complete results below.
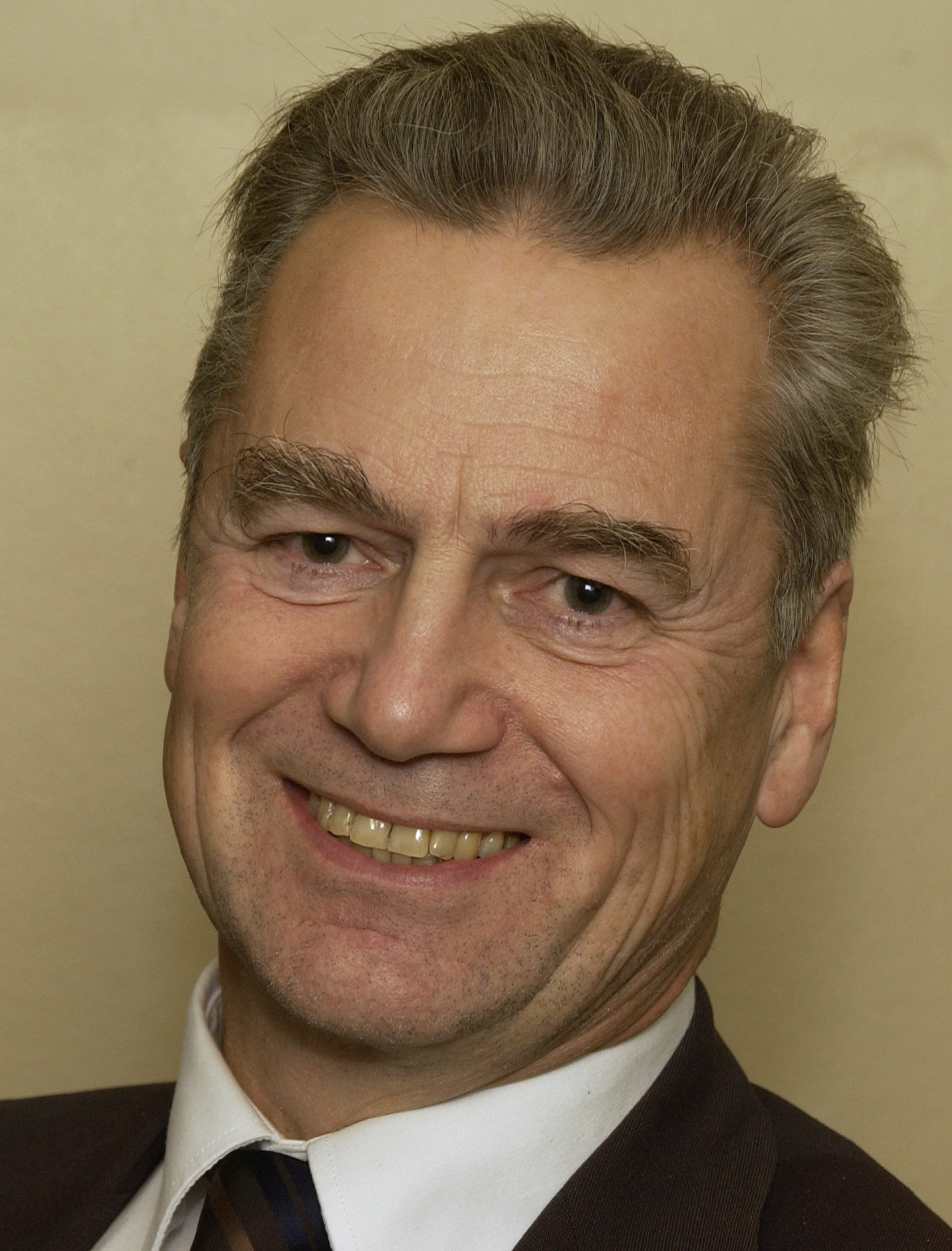
Lantråd before	Lantråd after
Ragnar Erlandsson; Åland Centre	Roger Jansson; Freeminded Co-operation

Legislative elections were held in Åland on 15 October 1995 to elect members of the Lagtinget. The 30 members were elected for a four-year term by proportional representation.

Following the elections, the previous government of the Åland Centre, Freeminded Co-operation and Åland Social Democrats, was replaced by one formed of the Åland Centre and Freeminded Co-operation, as well as one independent.

== Results ==
Party	Votes	%	Seats	+/–
Åland Centre	3,118	27.78	9	–1
Liberals for Åland	2,981	26.56	8	+1
Freeminded Co-operation	2,310	20.58	6	0
Åland Social Democrats	1,711	15.24	4	0
Non-aligned Coalition	1,104	9.84	3	0
Total	11,224	100.00	30	0
Valid votes	11,224	97.34		
Invalid/blank votes	307	2.66		
Total votes	11,531	100.00		
Registered voters/turnout	18,436	62.55		
Source: ASUB
