= 2003 Ålandic legislative election =

← 1999	19 October 2003	2007 →
- All 30 seats in the Parliament of Åland; 16 seats needed for a majority
- Turnout: 67.62% (▲1.66 pp)
Party	Leader	Vote %	Seats	+/–
Åland Centre	Roger Nordlund	24.14	7	−2
Liberals for Åland	Viveka Eriksson	24.06	7	−2
Social Democrats	Barbro Sundback	18.95	6	+3
Freeminded Co-op	Harriet Lindeman	13.58	4	0
Non-aligned Coalition	Gun-Mari Lindholm	9.42	3	−1
Future of Åland	Anders Eriksson	6.48	2	New
Åland Progress Group	Ronald Boman	3.37	1	0
This lists parties that won seats. See the complete results below.
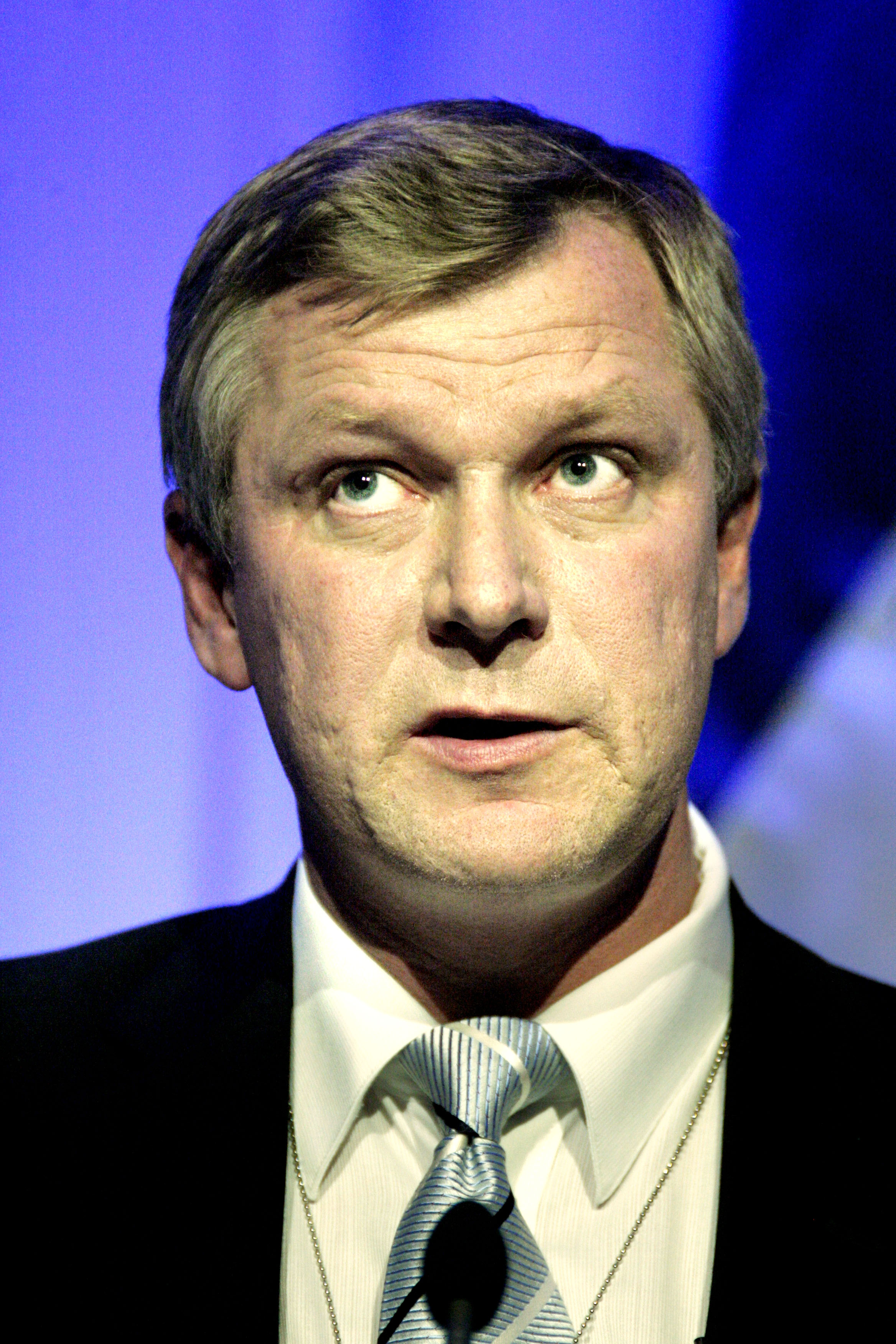

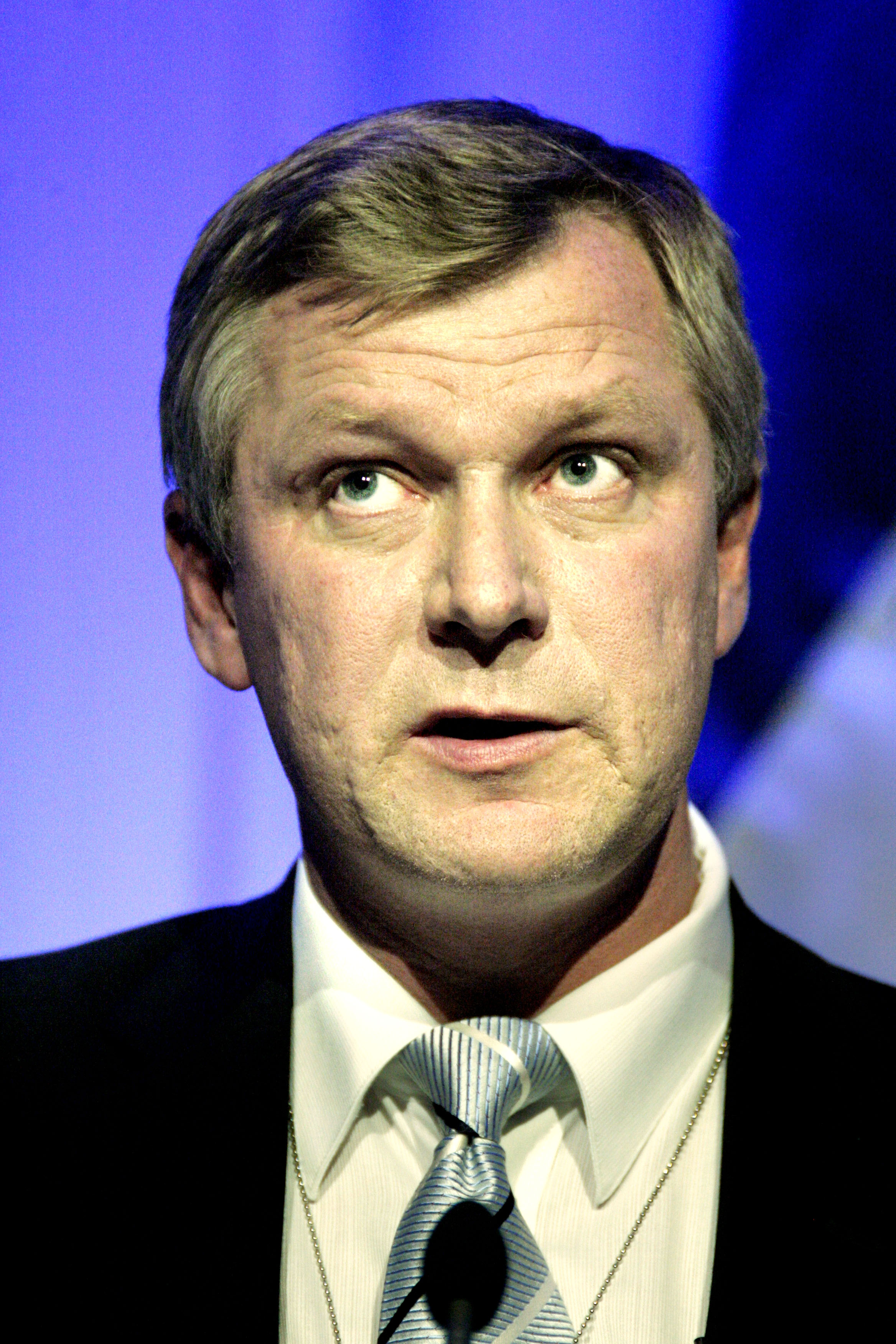
Lantråd before	Lantråd after
Roger Nordlund; Åland Centre	Roger Nordlund; Åland Centre

Legislative elections were held in Åland on 19 October 2003 to elect members of the Lagtinget. The 30 members were elected for a four-year term by proportional representation. Though the Åland Centre recorded its worst results to date in the elections, it regained its status as the largest party on Åland, beating out the Liberals for Åland by a mere 10 votes. The Åland Social Democrats had one of its best election results ever, doubling its representation in the Lagting.

Following the elections, the previous government formed by Åland Centre and the Liberals for Åland, was replaced by one comprising the Åland Centre, Liberals for Åland, Åland Social Democrats and Freeminded Co-operation parties.

== Results ==
Party	Votes	%	Seats	+/–
Åland Centre	2,980	24.14	7	–2
Liberals for Åland	2,970	24.06	7	–2
Åland Social Democrats	2,340	18.95	6	+3
Freeminded Co-operation	1,677	13.58	4	0
Non-aligned Coalition	1,163	9.42	3	–1
Future of Åland	800	6.48	2	New
Åland Progress Group	416	3.37	1	0
Total	12,346	100.00	30	0
Valid votes	12,346	96.26		
Invalid/blank votes	480	3.74		
Total votes	12,826	100.00		
Registered voters/turnout	18,969	67.62		
Source: ASUB
