= Lemland List =

Political party in Åland, Finland

Lemland List (in Swedish: Lemlandslistan) is an electoral alliance of Non-aligned Coalition and the Moderate Coalition for Åland in the municipality of Lemland, Åland, Finland.

In the 1999 elections the list won three seats in the municipal council. Prior to the 1999 elections the Åland Centre party had also taken part in the list. The list also contested the 2003 elections, winning some seats.
