= 1967 Ålandic legislative election =

Legislative elections were held in Åland on 2 and 3 September 1967.

== Results ==
Party	Votes	%	Seats	+/–
Landsbygdens och skargardens valforbund	4,822	62.77	20	New
Freeminded Co-operation	1,149	14.96	4	New
Alandsk Samlings avdelning for lontagare, arbetare, smabrukare, fiskare och sjoman	972	12.65	4	–3
Mittenliberalerna	555	7.22	2	New
Ålandic Left	184	2.40	0	New
Total	7,682	100.00	30	0
Registered voters/turnout		50.14		
