= 1983 Ålandic legislative election =

| ← 1979 | 16 October 1983 | 1987 → |
- All 30 seats in the Parliament of Åland; 16 seats needed for a majority
- Turnout: 64.41% (▲4.40pp)
| Party | Leader | Vote % | Seats | +/– |
|---|---|---|---|---|
| Åland Centre | Folke Woivalin | 35.62 | 11 | −3 |
| Liberals for Åland | | 28.89 | 9 | 0 |
| Freeminded Co-op | | 16.61 | 5 | +1 |
| Social Democrats | | 16.51 | 5 | +2 |
This lists parties that won seats. See the complete results below.
| Lantråd before | Lantråd after |
|---|---|
| Folke Woivalin; Åland Centre | Folke Woivalin; Åland Centre |

Legislative elections were held in Åland on 16 October 1983 to elect members of the Landstinget. The 30 members were elected for a four-year term by proportional representation.

The election were the last in which the Ålandic Left participated in an election.

== Results ==
| Party | Votes | % | Seats | +/– |
|---|---|---|---|---|
| Åland Centre | 3,704 | 35.62 | 11 | –3 |
| Liberals for Åland | 3,005 | 28.89 | 9 | 0 |
| Freeminded Co-operation | 1,727 | 16.61 | 5 | +1 |
| Åland Social Democrats | 1,717 | 16.51 | 5 | +2 |
| Ålandic Left | 247 | 2.38 | 0 | 0 |
| Total | 10,400 | 100.00 | 30 | 0 |
| Valid votes | 10,400 | 98.05 | | |
| Invalid/blank votes | 207 | 1.95 | | |
| Total votes | 10,607 | 100.00 | | |
| Registered voters/turnout | 16,467 | 64.41 | | |
Source: ASUB
