= 1971 Ålandic legislative election =

Legislative elections were held in Åland on 17 and 18 October 1971.

== Results ==
Party	Votes	%	Seats	+/–
Landsbygdens och skargardens valforbund	4,978	57.10	18	–2
Freeminded Co-operation	1,207	13.84	4	0
Alands socialdemokraters valforbund	1,144	13.12	4	New
Valforbundet Liberal Samling	663	7.60	2	New
Allmanna valforbundet	599	6.87	2	New
Ålandic Left	127	1.46	0	0
Total	8,718	100.00	30	0
