= 1999 Ålandic legislative election =

← 1995	17 October 1999	2003 →
- All 30 seats in the Parliament of Åland; 16 seats needed for a majority
- Turnout: 65.96% (▲3.41 pp)
Party	Leader	Vote %	Seats	+/–
Liberals for Åland	Lisbeth Eriksson	28.74	9	+1
Åland Centre	Roger Nordlund	27.32	9	0
Freeminded Co-op	Harriet Lindeman	14.52	4	−2
Non-aligned Coalition	Gun-Mari Lindholm	12.76	4	+1
Social Democrats	Barbro Sundback	11.84	3	−1
Åland Progress Group	Ronald Boman	4.81	1	New
This lists parties that won seats. See the complete results below.
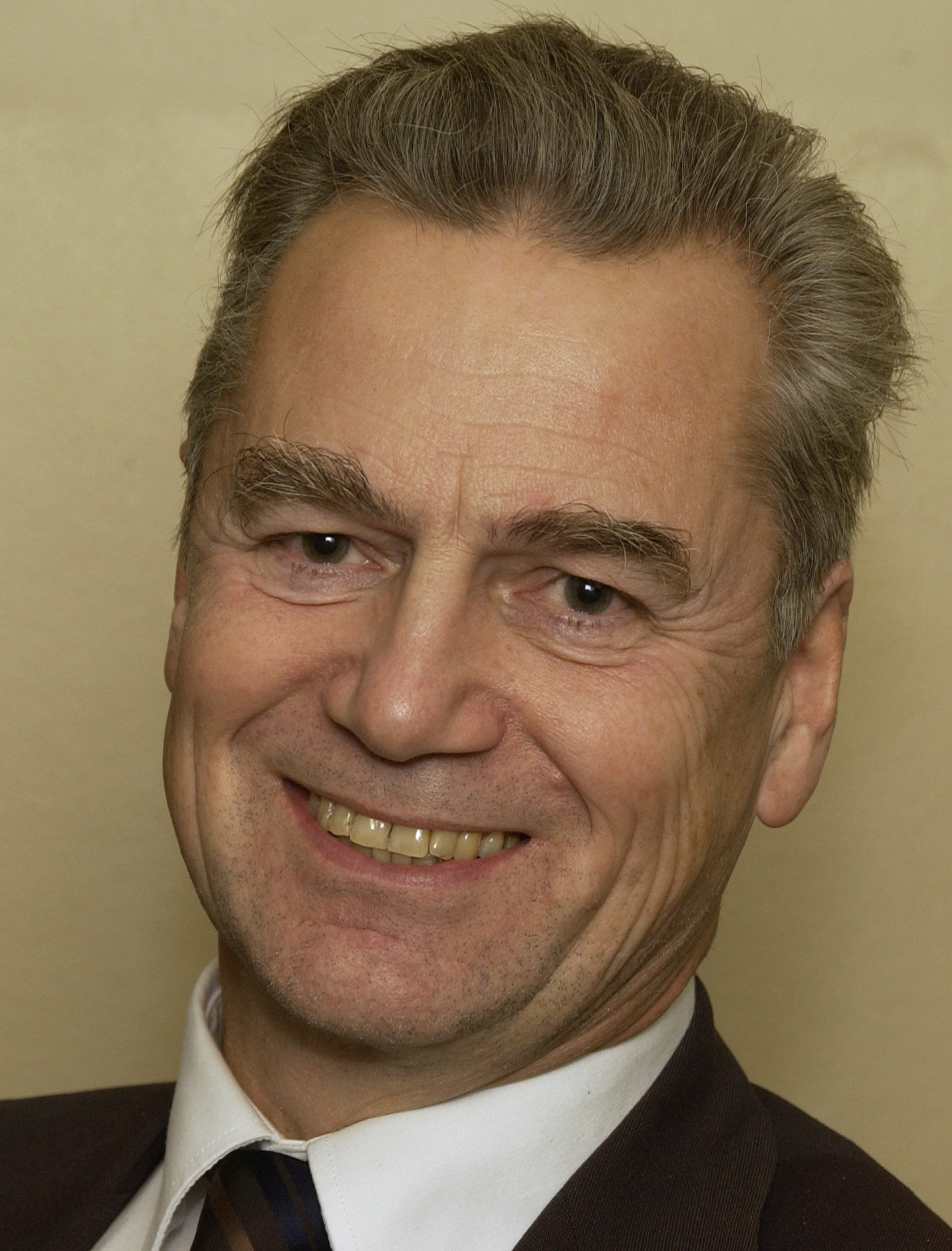

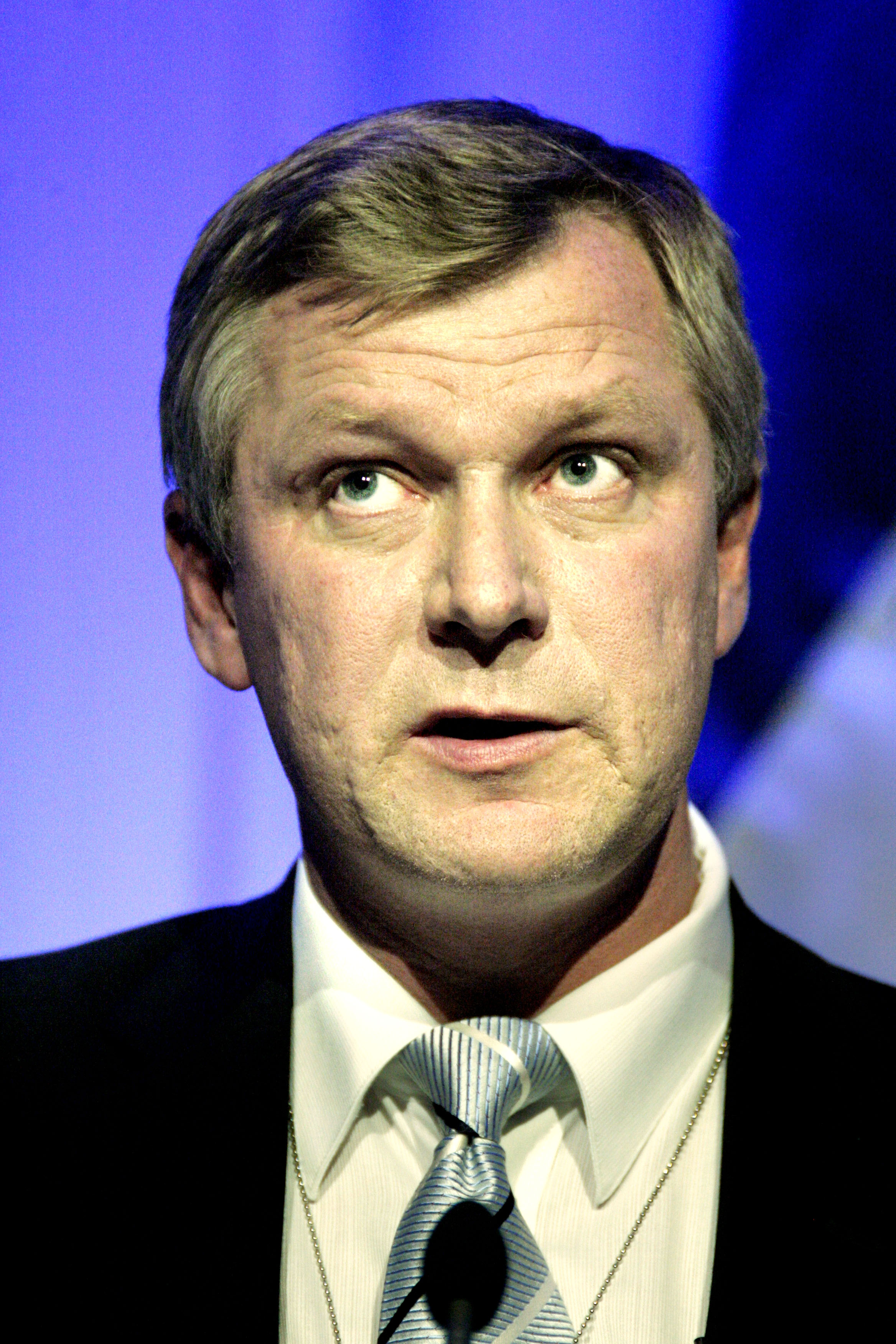
Lantråd before	Lantråd after
Roger Jansson; Freeminded Co-operation	Roger Nordlund; Åland Centre

Legislative elections were held in Åland on 17 October 1999 to elect members of the Lagtinget. The 30 members were elected for a four-year term by proportional representation. They were the first elections contested by the Åland Centre in which it did not emerge as the largest party, narrowly losing out to the Liberals for Åland.

The Åland Progress Group was a new party that was formed during the 1995 - 1999 session of the Lagting by a member of the Lagting who until that point had been a member of Freeminded Co-operation.

Following the elections, the previous government formed by Åland Centre, Freeminded Co-operation and one independent, was replaced by one comprising the Åland Centre, Freeminded Co-operation and the Non-aligned Coalition. However following a motion of no confidence in March 2001 this was replaced by a government made up of the Åland Centre and Liberals for Åland.

== Results ==
Party	Votes	%	Seats	+/–
Liberals for Åland	3,463	28.74	9	+1
Åland Centre	3,292	27.32	9	0
Freeminded Co-operation	1,750	14.52	4	–2
Non-aligned Coalition	1,537	12.76	4	+1
Åland Social Democrats	1,427	11.84	3	–1
Åland Progress Group	580	4.81	1	New
Total	12,049	100.00	30	0
Valid votes	12,049	97.72		
Invalid/blank votes	281	2.28		
Total votes	12,330	100.00		
Registered voters/turnout	18,694	65.96		
Source: ASUB
