= 2007 Ålandic legislative election =

- 21 October 2007
- All 30 seats in the Parliament of Åland; 16 seats needed for a majority
- Turnout: 67.80% (▲0.18 pp)
Party	Leader	Vote %	Seats	+/–
Liberals for Åland	Viveka Eriksson	32.56	10	+3
Åland Centre	Roger Nordlund	24.23	8	+1
Non-aligned Coalition	Gun-Mari Lindholm	12.27	4	+1
Social Democrats	Barbro Sundback	11.80	3	−3
Freeminded Co-op	Jörgen Strand	9.61	3	−1
Future of Åland	Anders Eriksson	8.34	2	0
This lists parties that won seats. See the complete results below.
Lantråd before	Lantråd after
Roger Nordlund; Åland Centre	Viveka Eriksson; Liberals for Åland

Legislative elections were held in Åland on 21 October 2007 to elect members of the Lagting. All 30 seats were up for election to four-year terms using proportional representation. The Åland Progress Group did not participate in the elections, as its sole member of the Lagting, Ronald Boman, opted to retire, while a new organisation, the Hut Group, unsuccessfully contested its first election.

The Liberals for Åland won the most seats in the election and formed a government with Åland Centre, in which Liberal Viveka Eriksson became the new premier.

== Opinion polls ==
A 2006 survey indicated that the Liberals for Åland would regain their status as the largest party in the Lagting, while the previously dominant Åland Centre would fall below 20% of the vote for the first time in its history. The Future of Åland, which supports the independence of Åland from Finland and was contesting its second election to the Lagting, would more than double its vote. A 2007 survey, on the other hand, indicated that the Åland Centre would remain the largest party in the Lagting.

Polling firm/Commissioner	Date	Sample size	C	Lib	ÅSD	FS	ObS	ÅF	Åfg	HUT
Tidningen Åland	13 October 2007	301	27.9; 9	22.6; 7	12.6; 4	11.4; 3	14.2; 4	10.3; 3	–	1.0; 0
Ålands statistik- och utredningsbyrå	Autumn 2006	~1,140	19.9; 6	24.0; 8	18.0; 6	14.2; 4	6.5; 2	13.6; 4	1.3; 0	–
2003 legislative election	19 October 2003	—N/a	24.1; 7	24.1; 7	19.0; 6	13.6; 4	9.4; 3	6.5; 2	3.4; 1	–

== Results ==
Ultimately, two of the parties in the Landskapstyrelse, Moderates of Åland and the Åland Social Democrats, incurred heavy losses, with the Social Democrat representation in the Lagting being cut in half and Freeminded Co-operation falling below 10% of the votes for the first time in the party's history. The third party in the government, the Åland Centre, made narrow gains. The winner of the election was the Liberals for Åland, who reclaimed the mantle as the largest party and, for the first time in the party's history, crossed the 30% mark.

The significant losses for the Moderates of Åland and the Social Democrats can be partially explained by discontent with the government, as well as the retirements of popular members of the Lagting, Harriet Lindeman (Moderates of Åland) and Lasse Wiklöf (Social Democrats). The election also marked the return of former Åland member of the Finnish parliament and member of the Lagting Gunnar Jansson for the Liberals, who became the most popular candidate with 745 votes cast for him, or 5.6% of all votes cast in the election. Former member of the Lagting, Lantråd (premier of the government of Åland) and recently retired member of the Finnish parliament, Roger Jansson (Moderates of Åland), while not receiving as many votes as Gunnar Jansson, was also elected.

Party	Votes	%	Seats	+/–
Liberals for Åland	4,176	32.56	10	+3
Åland Centre	3,107	24.23	8	+1
Non-aligned Coalition	1,573	12.27	4	+1
Åland Social Democrats	1,513	11.80	3	–3
Freeminded Co-operation	1,233	9.61	3	–1
Future of Åland	1,070	8.34	2	0
Hut Group	153	1.19	0	New
Total	12,825	100.00	30	0
Valid votes	12,825	97.41		
Invalid/blank votes	341	2.59		
Total votes	13,166	100.00		
Registered voters/turnout	19,418	67.80		
Source: ASUB
