= Mats Löfström =

Finnish politician

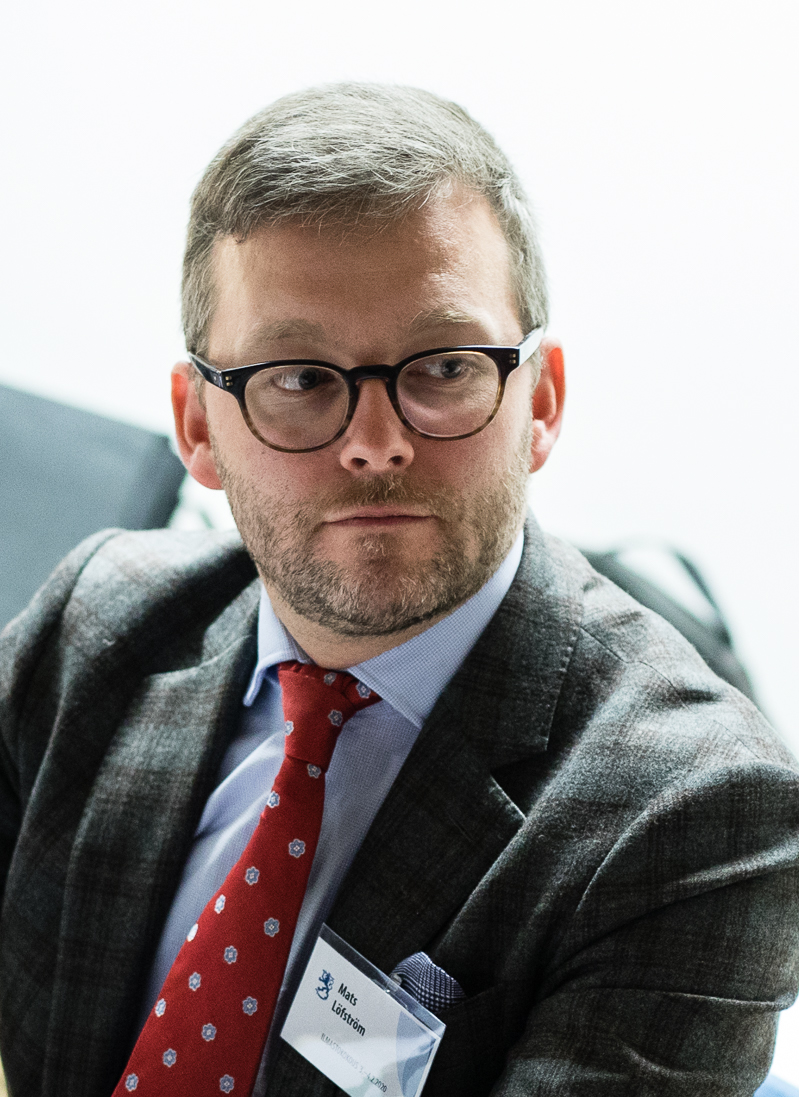
- Löfström in 2020

Member of Parliament
- Incumbent
- Assumed office 22 April 2015
- Constituency: Åland

Personal details
- Born: 27 October 1983 (age 42) Eckerö, Åland
- Party: Åland Centre
- Spouse: Noora Löfström (m. 2014)
- Website: www.lofstrom.ax

Mats Löfström (born 27 October 1983) is a Finnish politician representing Åland Centre. Löfström is the single member of parliament for the autonomous region of Åland in the Parliament of Finland. He was an Åland Centre party candidate to the Finnish Parliament on the Åland Coalition list at the 2015 Finnish parliamentary election. Löfström was elected, replacing Elisabeth Nauclér as the single representative of Åland in the Finnish Parliament. Löfström was re-elected in 2019 and 2023.

== Personal life ==
Löfström was born in Eckerö. He has been married to his spouse Noora since 2014.

== Honours ==
- Knight first class of the Order of the Lion of Finland (Finland, 2023)

Assembly seats
Preceded by Elisabeth Nauclér	Member of Finnish Parliament for Åland; 2015–present	Incumbent
