= Young Finns =

Young Finns Nuorsuomalaiset
- Founded: 1994
- Dissolved: 1999
- Newspaper: LIVE!
- Ideology: Liberalism
- Political position: Centre-right

Website
- www.nuorsuom.fi

Young Finns (Finnish: Nuorsuomalaiset) was a liberal political party in Finland founded in 1994 and abolished in 1999. In the 1995 parliamentary elections, the party gained two seats, held by Risto Penttilä and Jukka Tarkka. In the 1999 election, Young Finns failed to get any seats and it was discontinued. Until 1997, the party was known as Young Finnish Party.

The Young Finnish Party promoted itself as an "anti-party party" and a "party for apolitical people." The party’s aim was to break away from traditional party politics and challenge the “elite of the older generations”, for whom the Nordic welfare state had been “almost a religion”. The party demanded tax cuts, a "renovation" of the welfare state, a flat tax, and tax exemptions for low incomes.

Before the 1999 election, Young Finns considered merging with the Liberal People's Party and drafts were signed but after the failure this was not continued.

== Elections ==
Results
Parliamentary
Year	MPs	Votes	
1995	2	78,066	2.81%
1999	0	28,084	1.05%
Municipal
Year	Councillors	Votes	
1996	29	31,429	1.32%
European parliament
Year	MEPs	Votes	
1996	0	68,134	3.03%
