= Parliament building of Åland =

Coordinates: 60.0982°N 19.9453°E

Autonomy Building
- Självstyrelsegården
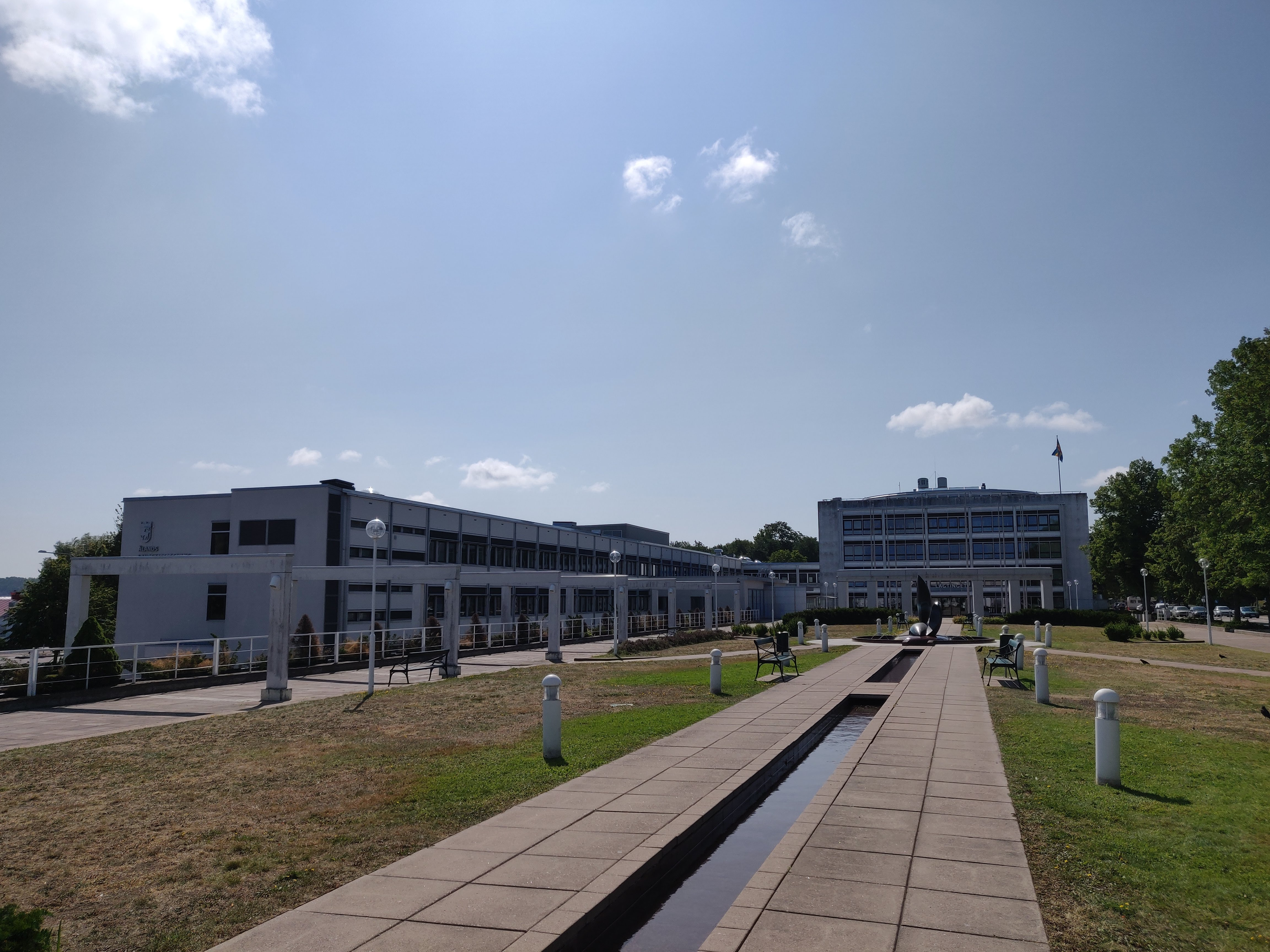

General information
- Type: Governmental
- Location: 37 Strandgatan, Mariehamn 22100, Åland Islands, Finland
- Completed: 1978; 48 years ago
- Owner: Government of Åland

Design and construction
- Architect: Helmer Stenros

The Autonomy Building (Swedish: Självstyrelsegården) is the seat of the Parliament of Åland. It is located in Mariehamn, the capital of Åland.

== History ==
The Autonomy Building was designed by the Finnish architect Helmer Stenros, who won the Nordic architectural competition for Åland’s administrative and cultural center in Mariehamn. The buildings are part of Project 77, which also included the construction of the Åland Museum and Hotel Arkipelag. It was completed in 1978.

The Society House in Mariehamn, which was demolished in 1975, formerly stood on the site.

== Architecture and features ==
The interior was largely planned by designer Pirkko Stenros and features period-typical furniture designed by architects such as Yrjö Kukkapuro and Alvar Aalto. The building is approximately 17,000 cubic metres (600,000 cu ft) and consists of two different parts. The Parliament House contains the plenary hall, committee rooms, the Parliament's office, Parliament's library, and meeting rooms. The plenary hall was originally meant for congresses, but with the construction of the Alandica Culture and Congress building the plenary hall is reserved for the Parliament.
