= Reform Group (Finland) =

Reform Group Finnish: Remonttiryhmä
- Founded: 1998
- Dissolved: 2001

Website
- www.remmi.net

The Reform Group (Finnish: Remonttiryhmä, lit. 'Renovation Group'; Swedish: Reformgruppen) was a political party in Finland between 1998 and 2001.

== History ==
The party first contested national elections in 1999, when they received 1% of the vote in the parliamentary elections, winning a single seat. In the presidential elections the following year, the party nominated Risto Kuisma as their candidate. However, he received just 0.6% of the vote.

The party did not contest any further national elections.

== Ideology ==
The party's mission statement was "to build a just society". It aimed to achieve full employment through a job guarantee. It also called for reductions in income taxes, especially on low income taxpayers, making society "family-centered", and animal welfare.

== See also ==
- List of Social Democratic Party (Finland) breakaway parties
