= 2023 Ålandic legislative election =

- 15 October 2023
- All 30 seats in the Parliament of Åland; 16 seats needed for a majority
- Turnout: 68.29% (▼1.39pp)
Party	Leader	Vote %	Seats	+/–
Liberals for Åland	Katrin Sjögren	29.93	9	+3
Åland Centre	Veronica Thörnroos	21.24	7	−2
Non-aligned Coalition	Bert Häggblom	15.31	5	+1
Social Democrats	Camilla Gunell	12.82	4	+1
Moderate Coalition	Wille Valve	12.54	4	0
Sustainable Initiative	Annette Bergbo	5.13	1	−1
This lists parties that won seats. See the complete results below.
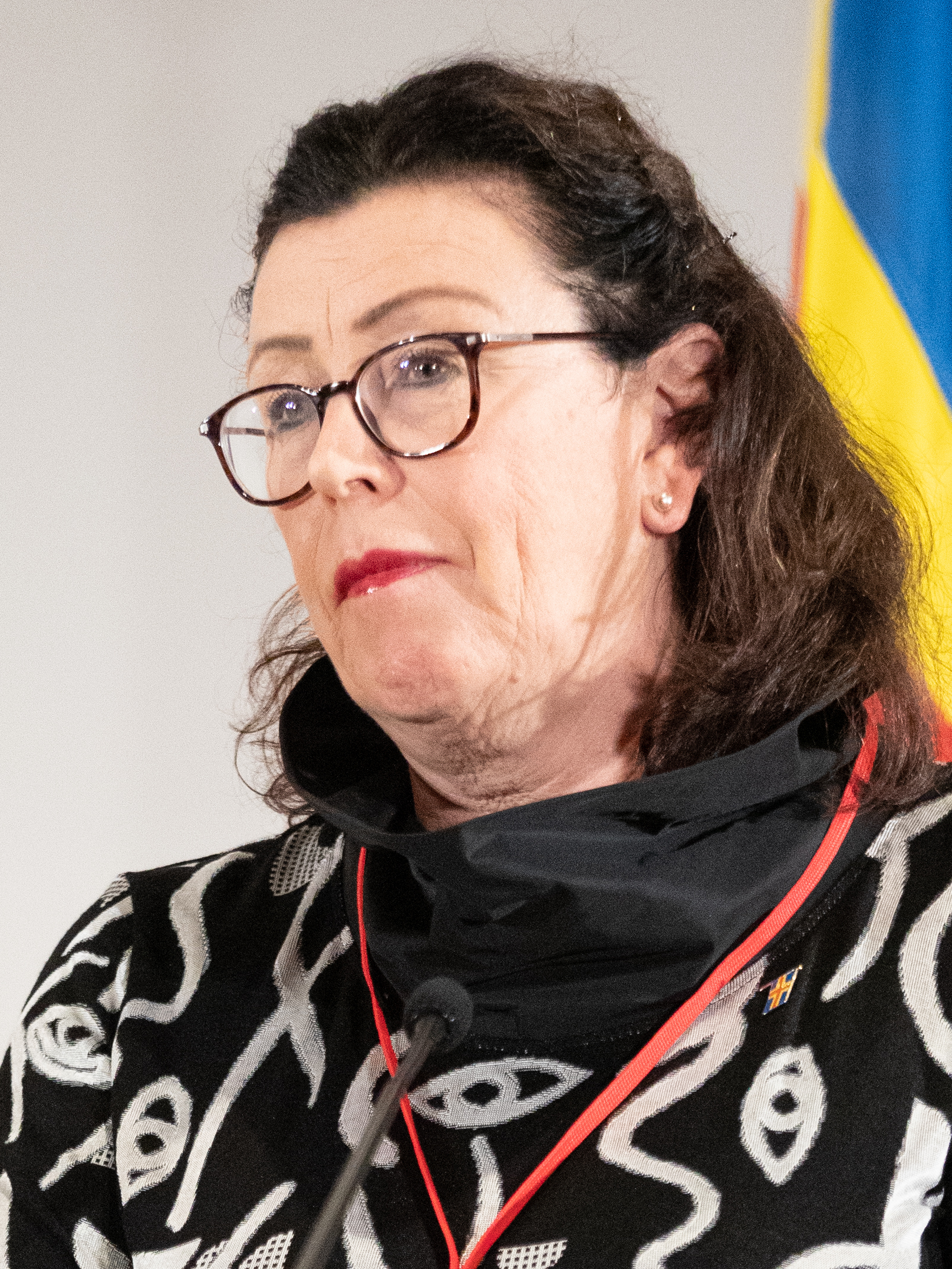

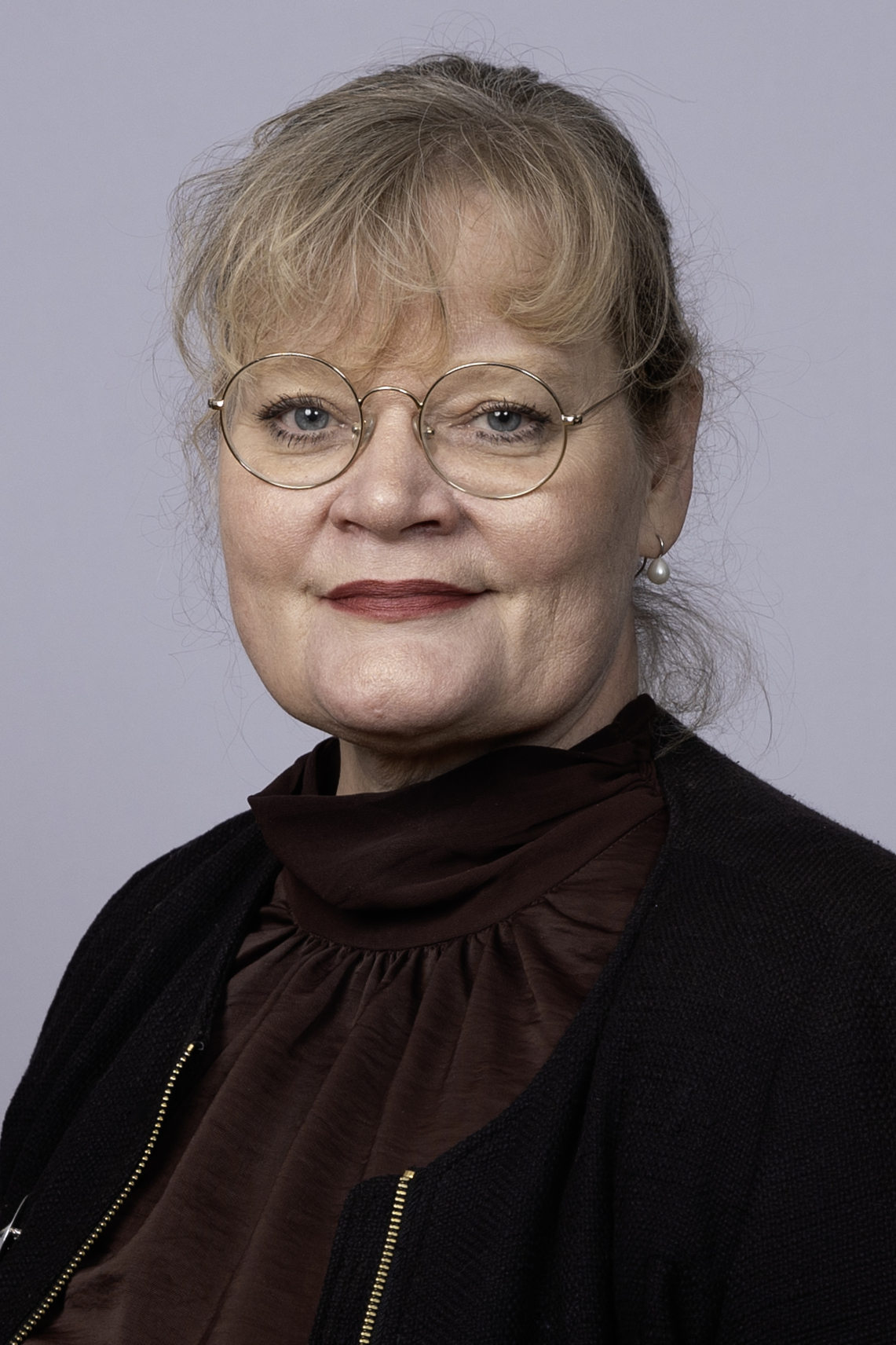
Lantråd before	Lantråd after
Veronica Thörnroos; Åland Centre	Katrin Sjögren; Liberals for Åland

Legislative elections were held in Åland on 15 October 2023 to elect the 30 members of the Parliament of Åland for a four-year term. The Liberals for Åland became the largest party and Katrin Sjögren was appointed Lantråd, succeeding Veronica Thörnroos.

== Electoral system ==
The 30 members of the Parliament of Åland were elected by proportional representation, with seats allocated using the d'Hondt method.

== Opinion polls ==
Polling execution		Parties											Blocs		
Polling firm	Date	Government				Opposition					Uncertain	Lead	Percentage		Lead
Polling firm	Date	C	MS	ObS	HI	L	ÅSD	ÅF	ÅD	LBP	Uncertain	Lead	Govt	Opp	Lead
Result	15 October 2023	21.24	12.54	15.31	5.13	29.93	12.82	2.87	—N/a	—N/a	—N/a	54.22	45.62	8.6	
Åland Gallup	February 2023	18.0	8.1	12.0	9.3	23.1	20.1	7.1	1.0	1.2	12.8	38.1	61.8	23.7	
Åland Gallup	January 2023	15.7	8.7	11.3	8.6	26.1	20.8	4.3	3.0	1.6	18.2	35.7	64.4	28.7	
Åland Gallup	December 2022	16.9	10.8	10.0	5.8	26.9	17.1	6.6	3.4	2.6	21.5	37.7	62.4	24.7	
Åland Gallup	November 2022	19.6	9.5	7.9	8.6	27.1	17.3	4.1	3.6	2.3	20.7	37.0	63.0	26.0	
Åland Gallup	October 2022	20.0	12.0	7.7	7.8	20.7	17.7	7.5	4.7	1.8	14.6	39.7	60.2	20.5	
Åland Gallup	August 2022	18.8	9.6	9.6	10.8	24.2	17.8	5.1	2.4	1.8	19.6	48.8	51.3	2.5	
Åland Gallup	June 2022	19.7	11.6	6.8	9.2	21.7	18.3	6.0	3.6	3.0	23.9	47.3	52.6	5.3	
Åland Gallup	March 2022	21.8	8.8	6.2	7.4	21.3	15.6	5.0	2.7	11.1	17.0	44.2	55.7	11.5	
Åland Gallup	February 2022	26.6	9.9	6.9	4.7	25.3	19.1	5.4	2.0	—N/a	19.0	48.1	51.8	3.7	
Åland Gallup	December 2021	21.0	11.3	12.3	9.0	19.4	13.8	6.4	6.8	—N/a	20.3	53.6	46.4	7.2	
Åland Gallup	October 2021	23.7	8.8	10.8	7.8	23.0	15.3	7.4	3.3	—N/a	17.4	51.1	49.0	2.1	
Åland Gallup	August 2021	22.5	10.0	8.5	4.8	22.9	17.8	7.2	6.3	—N/a	16.9	45.8	54.2	8.4	
Åland Gallup	July 2021	25.8	9.2	8.1	5.8	25.2	17.7	6.0	2.1	—N/a	19.2	48.9	51.0	2.1	
Åland Gallup	May 2021	21.6	11.7	12.6	8.0	24.0	13.7	6.7	1.7	—N/a	16.5	53.9	46.1	7.8	
Åland Gallup	April 2021	22.4	13.3	11.9	8.9	23.3	12.7	5.8	1.5	—N/a	11.3	56.5	43.3	13.2	
Åland Gallup	March 2021	19.2	10.7	11.0	9.2	26.5	13.4	8.1	1.9	—N/a	11.2	50.1	49.9	0.2	
Åland Gallup	January 2021	25.3	10.5	8.7	9.0	26.5	13.1	4.4	2.5	—N/a	12.3	53.5	46.5	7.0	
Åland Gallup	November 2020	25.3	12.5	9.3	7.3	26.0	11.1	7.0	1.6	—N/a	9.0	54.4	45.7	8.7	
Åland Gallup	October 2020	24.5	9.2	10.5	8.2	26.0	5.8	14.0	1.8	—N/a	12.9	52.4	47.6	4.8	
Åland Gallup	August 2020	22.1	13.4	5.4	13.1	25.6	3.7	14.4	2.3	—N/a	12.9	54.0	46.0	8.0	
Åland Gallup	June 2020	29.6	11.9	8.7	7.6	22.6	3.3	14.1	2.1	—N/a	11.4	57.8	42.1	15.7	
Åland Gallup	May 2020	27.8	12.6	7.3	8.5	25.8	4.1	12.6	1.3	—N/a	12.1	56.2	43.8	12.4	
Åland Gallup	April 2020	26.8	11.7	9.6	10.8	24.9	2.1	12.4	1.8	—N/a	12.7	58.9	41.2	17.7	
Åland Gallup	March 2020	35.7	10.7	6.5	8.5	22.9	2.3	11.7	1.7	—N/a	11.6	61.4	38.6	22.8	
Åland Gallup	February 2020	24.0	14.7	8.9	8.7	28.7	3.2	9.5	2.2	—N/a	11.3	56.3	43.6	12.7	
Åland Gallup	January 2020	26.5	12.5	8.6	8.5	23.9	4.1	13.0	2.9	—N/a	10.9	56.1	43.9	12.2	
Åland Gallup	December 2019	25.7	12.1	13.8	9.2	21.4	4.5	11.6	4.9	—N/a	9.3	57.5	42.4	15.1	
Åland Gallup	November 2019	25.3	12.1	10.3	11.2	22.8	4.0	11.1	3.3	—N/a	4.5	58.9	41.2	17.7	
2019 election	20 October 2019	27.84	13.80	13.57	8.33	19.66	9.20	4.67	2.93	—N/a	–	63.54	36.46	27.08	

== Results ==
The Liberals for Åland gained three seats and became the largest party with nine seats. Åland Centre lost two seats and finished second. The Non-aligned Coalition and Åland Social Democrats each gained one seat. The Moderate Coalition for Åland retained its four seats. Sustainable Initiative lost one seat and held one. The Future of Åland lost its only seat. Turnout was 68.29%.

Party	Votes	%	+/–	Seats	+/–
Liberals for Åland	4,204	29.93	+10.27	9	+3
Åland Centre	2,983	21.24	–6.60	7	–2
Non-aligned Coalition	2,150	15.31	+1.74	5	+1
Åland Social Democrats	1,801	12.82	+3.62	4	+1
Moderate Coalition for Åland	1,761	12.54	–1.26	4	0
Sustainable Initiative	720	5.13	–3.20	1	–1
Future of Åland	403	2.87	–1.80	0	–1
Independent	22	0.16	New	0	New
Total	14,044	100.00	–	30	0
Valid votes	14,044	96.64			
Invalid votes	341	2.35			
Blank votes	147	1.01			
Total votes	14,532	100.00			
Registered voters/turnout	21,279	68.29			
Source: Val
