= Future of Åland =

Future of Åland Ålands Framtid
- Chairperson: Peggy Eriksson
- Founded: 2001
- Split from: Åland Centre
- Headquarters: Ålands Lagting, Strandgatan 37, 22100 Mariehamn
- Ideology: Liberalism; Ålandic independence Souverainism; Cultural conservatism Pacifism
- Political position: Centre to centre-right
- European affiliation: European Free Alliance
- Nordic affiliation: Centre Group
- Colours: Orange
- Slogan: We show the way (Vi visar vägen)
- Lagtinget: 0 / 30
- Municipalities: 3 / 208
- Eduskunta: 0 / 200
- European Parliament: 0 / 15

Website
- alandsframtid.ax

The Future of Åland (Swedish: Ålands Framtid) is a separatist political party on Åland. As a member of the European Free Alliance, the goal of the party is to make Åland an independent state.

== Election results ==
=== Parliament of Åland (Lagting) ===
Election	Votes	%	Seats	+/-	Government
2003	800	6.48	2 / 30	New	Opposition
2007	1,070	8.34	2 / 30	Steady	Opposition
2011	1,286	9.91	3 / 30	▲1	Opposition
2015	1,016	7.35	2 / 30	▼1	Opposition
2019	666	4.67	1 / 30	▼1	Opposition
2023	403	2.87	0 / 30	▼1	Extra-parliamentary

== See also ==
- Political parties and elections in Åland
