= Åland Progress Group =

Åland Progress Group Ålands Framstegsgrupp
- Founded: during 1995-1999 parliamentary erm
- Split from: Freeminded Co-operation

Party flag

Website
- www.afg.aland.fi

The Åland Progress Group (Swedish: Ålands Framstegsgrupp) was a political party in the Åland Islands that contested elections in 1999 and 2003.

== History ==
The party split from Freeminded Co-operation during the 1995–1999 parliamentary term. In the elections of 2003, the party received 3.4% of popular vote and one of the 30 seats. In 2007 it didn't run as its sole representative Ronald Boman retired.
