= Kirjava "Puolue" – Elonkehän Puolesta =

Kirjava ”Puolue” – Elonkehän Puolesta
- Abbreviation: KiPu
- Founded: 1988
- Dissolved: 2003

Kirjava "Puolue" – Elonkehän Puolesta (KiPu; Swedish: Det Eko-Brokiga Partiet) was a Finnish political party founded in 1988, best known for its alliance with Pertti "Veltto" Virtanen. It was a faction of the Green movement, which is now represented by the Green League in parliament. Virtanen went on to change allegiance to the Finns Party and was re-elected for two terms in 2007 and 2011.

== History ==
The original name from 1992 was Vihreät (The Greens), then it changed to Ekologinen puolue Vihreät (Ecological Party the Greens) and became Kirjava Puolue in 1998.

The only MP the party had was Virtanen, who served between 1995 and 1999. In 2003, the party was removed from the party register after failing to gain MPs in two consecutive elections.

The party advocated degrowth and rejection of Finnish membership in any global economic organizations; thus, EU, WTO, GATT, IMF and World Bank. It also opposed new construction, wanted to reduce energy consumption and limit population growth. Instead, it proposed that organic farming should be the main livelihood.
