= Non-aligned Coalition =

Non-aligned Coalition Obunden Samling
- Abbreviation: ObS
- Chairperson: Marcus Måtar
- Founded: 1987
- Split from: Åland Centre
- Headquarters: Parliament of Åland, Strandgatan 37, 22100 Mariehamn
- Ideology: Conservatism; Regionalism; Sovereigntism; Euroscepticism; Ålandic independence
- Political position: Centre-right
- Nordic affiliation: Conservative Group
- Colours: Yellow; Black
- Lagtinget: 5 / 30
- Municipalities: 24 / 208

Website
- obs.ax

The Non-aligned Coalition (Swedish: Obunden Samling) is a conservative political party on the Åland Islands. It was founded in 1987.

In 2013 it was announced that the party would merge with the Moderates. All of the party's parliament members joined the Moderates to form Moderate Coalition for Åland. However the party survived as one of the original founders Bert Häggblom returned to recreate the party with new members.

== History ==
The party was founded in 1987, mostly by young members who broke away from the Åländsk Center.

Gradually, the party has developed increasingly comprehensive election programmes and won seats in the Parliament of Åland with constantly increasing election figures, including at the municipal level, except for the 2003 election. Unbound Collection was the fourth largest party in terms of seat distribution in the Åland Parliament during the 2006-2011 term. However, the party has not won more than five seats. Åland's municipal councils have been filled by 24 representatives of Obunden samling since the 2011 election.

Former party chairman Gun-Mari Lindholm was elected second deputy speaker of the Åland Parliament for the 2006-2011 term and took up the post of Minister of State in the Government of Åland in 2011 for two years. Fredrik ‘Frille’ Karlström also took up a ministerial post but for the full term, as Minister of Economic Affairs.

The party has supported Elisabeth Nauclér in the 2007 and 2011 parliamentary elections, who was also elected with a large majority.

The youth network Unga obundna was founded in 2010 by Simon Holmström, who was also elected president. After the 2011 elections, the organisation was dissolved.

On 28 October 2013, Nya Åland announced that Obunden Samling intended to merge with Moderaterna på Åland.

After internal discussions, Obunden Samling's parliamentary group and two ministers merged with Moderaterna på Åland, and in 2014 formed a common platform called Moderat Samling.

After the transition, Obunden Samling had no representation in the parliament or the regional government, since the parliamentary group joined the Moderaterna på Åland in the middle of a term.

In the 2015 election, Obunden Samling made a comeback and managed to regain 3 of its 4 seats that it lost with the transition to the Moderates. Today, Lars Häggblom and Bert Häggblom are elected and represent Obunden Samling in the Lagting. The third member of the Lagting, Fredrik Fredlund, left Obunden Samling in the autumn of 2018 following a conviction by the Åland District Court.

In the 2019 Ålandic legislative election, Obunden Samling increased from 3 seats to 4 seats in the Lagting.

In the 2023 parliamentary elections, Unbound Coalition increased from 4 seats to 5 seats in the Lagting. The Lagting group consists of party chairman Marcus Måtar, Christian Wikström, Stellan Egeland, Johan Lindström and Andreas Kanborg. Egeland received the second most votes in the entire election.

== Ideology ==
The party's policies consist of conservative, liberal and radical ideas and it considers itself outside the traditional right-left divide. The Non-aligned Coalition considers itself values and issue-based, and wants to prioritize cooperative and results-oriented management of affairs rather than party, authority and personal politics. Nevertheless, the party is usually labelled as right of centre. It was also described as supportive of Ålandic separatism.

The Non-aligned Coalition postulates the total overtaking of taxation powers by Åland. It is mainly oriented around the issue of the European Union - the party opposes EU membership of Åland and instead favors a free-trade agreement or a loose customs union. The party criticizes Finland for not demanding op-outs within the EU like Denmark did, and argues that the actions of EU undermine the practice of subsidiarity and autonomy. The party believes that the membership in the EU undermined the autonomy of Åland, ceding a portion of its self-government rights to "unaccountable bureaucrats" in Brussels; it also states that the EU only wanted the Nordics in to become net payers to the budget.

In terms of domestic policies, the party stresses the issue of inequality and regional disparities on Åland, expressign concern that the farmers, the fishers and the rural communities of Åland struggle with issues like poverty and underdevelopment as Mariehamn has become the dominant region. The party believes that the Saami Protocol of Finland, which refers to the “exclusive rights to reindeer husbandry within the Saami territory”, should also be extended to Åland in order to protect traditional ways of life on the island. The Non-aligned Coalition also advocates halting the outsourcing of jobs to Finland or other EU members, believing that it causes the depopulation of Åland and further regional inequality. The party considers development and extension of Åland autonomy and the improvement of wellbeing of rural communities its main priorities. To this end, it has been described as sovereigntist.

In addition to its conservative profile, the Non-aligned Coalition is particularly in favour of decentralization, with as many decisions as possible being taken at the regional and direct democratic level. The party argues that larger political units are becoming increasingly distant from the citizenry. Therefore, the party is also EU-skeptical and advocates the autonomy of Åland not only on the grounds of preserving the Swedish language and the independent culture of the island, but also because of the concern that the special opinion of the Åland population could be ignored if the Finnish government had a greater influence on the autonomous province. In terms of its regionalist outlook, the Unbound Collection in Åland can be compared to the Freie Wähler in Germany.

== Election results ==
=== Parliament of Åland (Lagting) ===
Election	Votes	%	Seats	+/-	Government
1987	750	7.04	3 / 30	New	Opposition
1991	1,047	9.74	3 / 30	▲1	Opposition
1995	1,104	9.84	3 / 30	Steady	Opposition
1999	1,537	12.76	4 / 30	▲1	Coalition (1999–2001)
1999	1,537	12.76	4 / 30	▲1	Opposition (2001–2003)
2003	1,163	9.42	3 / 30	▼1	Coalition (2003–2004)
2003	1,163	9.42	3 / 30	▼1	Opposition (2004–2007)
2007	1,573	12.27	4 / 30	▲1	Opposition
2011	1,639	12.63	4 / 30	Steady	Coalition
2015	1,328	9.61	3 / 30	▼1	Opposition
2019	1,935	13.57	4 / 30	▲1	Coalition
2023	2,150	15.31	5 / 30	▲1	Opposition

== See also ==
- Lemland List
