= Ålandic Left =

The Ålandic Left (Swedish: Åländsk Vänster) was a political party in Åland, Finland.

== History ==
The party contested the 1979 and 1983 elections for the Parliament of Åland, but failed to win a seat.

== Election results ==
- 1979: 195 (2.1%)
- 1983: 244 (2.3%)
