= Greens on Åland =

Greens on Åland (Swedish: Gröna på Åland) was a political party in Åland that won 2 seats in the 1987 election.
