= Sune Eriksson =

Finnish politician

Sune Eriksson (born 19 March 1939) is a politician who served as the Premier of Åland Islands, an autonomous and unilingually Swedish territory of Finland.

- Minister of social affairs and environment 2001–2003
- Speaker, Ålands lagting (Åland parliament) 1999–2000
- 1st deputy speaker 1995–1999
- Premier (lantråd) 1988–1991
- Member of Ålands lagting (Åland parliament) 1979–1999
