= Moderate Coalition for Åland =

Moderate Coalition for Åland Moderat Samling för Åland
- Abbreviation: MS
- Chairperson: Wille Valve
- Founded: 2015
- Merger of: Moderates of Åland; Non-aligned Coalition (original)
- Headquarters: Parliament of Åland, Strandgatan 37, 22100 Mariehamn
- Youth wing: Moderate Youth League for Åland
- Ideology: Liberal conservatism
- Political position: Centre-right
- Nordic affiliation: Conservative Group
- Colours: Blue
- Eduskunta (Åland Coalition): 0 / 1
- Lagtinget: 4 / 30

Website
- www.moderaterna.ax

The Moderate Coalition for Åland (Swedish: Moderat Samling för Åland, abbr. MS) is a liberal-conservative political party in Åland.

== History ==
The MS was formed by a merger of the Moderates of Åland and the Non-aligned Coalition (ObS), although not all members of the ObS agreed with the move, and the party continued to exist.

== Election results ==
=== Parliament of Åland ===
Election	Votes	%	Seats	+/–	Status
2015	2,470	17.88	5 / 30	New	Coalition
2019	1,967	13.80	4 / 30	▼1	Coalition
2023	1,761	12.54	4 / 30	Steady	Opposition
