= Liberals for Åland =

Liberals for Åland Liberalerna på Åland
- Chairperson: Katrin Sjögren
- Founded: 1978
- Merger of: Mittenliberalerna & LOS-Liberalerna
- Headquarters: Parliament of Åland, Strandgatan 37, 22100 Mariehamn
- Youth wing: Ålands Liberala Ungdomsgrupp
- Women's wing: Liberala Kvinnogruppen
- Ideology: Liberalism
- International affiliation: Liberal International (observer)
- Nordic affiliation: Centre Group
- Colours: Blue; Lilac (former)
- Eduskunta (Åland Coalition): 0 / 1
- Lagtinget: 9 / 30
- Municipalities: 34 / 208

Website
- www.liberalerna.ax

The Liberals for Åland (Swedish: Liberalerna på Åland) is a liberal political party on the Åland Islands. The party is an observer member of the Liberal International. The current party leader is Katrin Sjögren.

== Elections ==
Ålandic parliament

Year	MPs	Votes	
1979	9	2763	29.6%
1983	9	3005	28.9%
1987	8	2530	23.7%
1991	7	2462	22.9%
1995	8	2981	26.6%
1999	9	3463	28.7%
2003	7	2970	24.1%
2007	10	4176	32.6%
2011	6	2630	20.3%
2015	7	3216	23.3%
2019	6	2788	19.6%
2023	9	3052	29.9%

Municipal council

Year	Councillors	Votes	
1995	43	2677	23.5%
1999	45	3034	24.8%
2003	42	2871	22.9%
2007	41	3535	27.8%
2011	34	2531	18.8%
2015	34	2946	20.2%

Finnish parliament

Year	MPs	Votes	
1995	1	6038	61.0%
1999	1	5870	56.1%
2003	–	3323	28.5%
2015	–	1277	10.5%

== See also ==
- Liberalism
- Liberalism worldwide
- List of liberal parties
