= Parliament of Åland =

Elected legislature of Åland, Finland

Coordinates: 60.0978°N 19.9450°E

Parliament of Åland Ålands lagting

Type
- Type: Unicameral

Leadership
- Speaker: Ingrid Zetterman, Liberals since 15 October 2023

Structure
- Seats: 30
- Political groups: Government (20): Liberals for Åland (9); Åland Centre (7); Åland Social Democrats (4); Opposition (10): Non-aligned Coalition (5); Moderate Coalition for Åland (4); Sustainable Initiative (1)

Meeting place
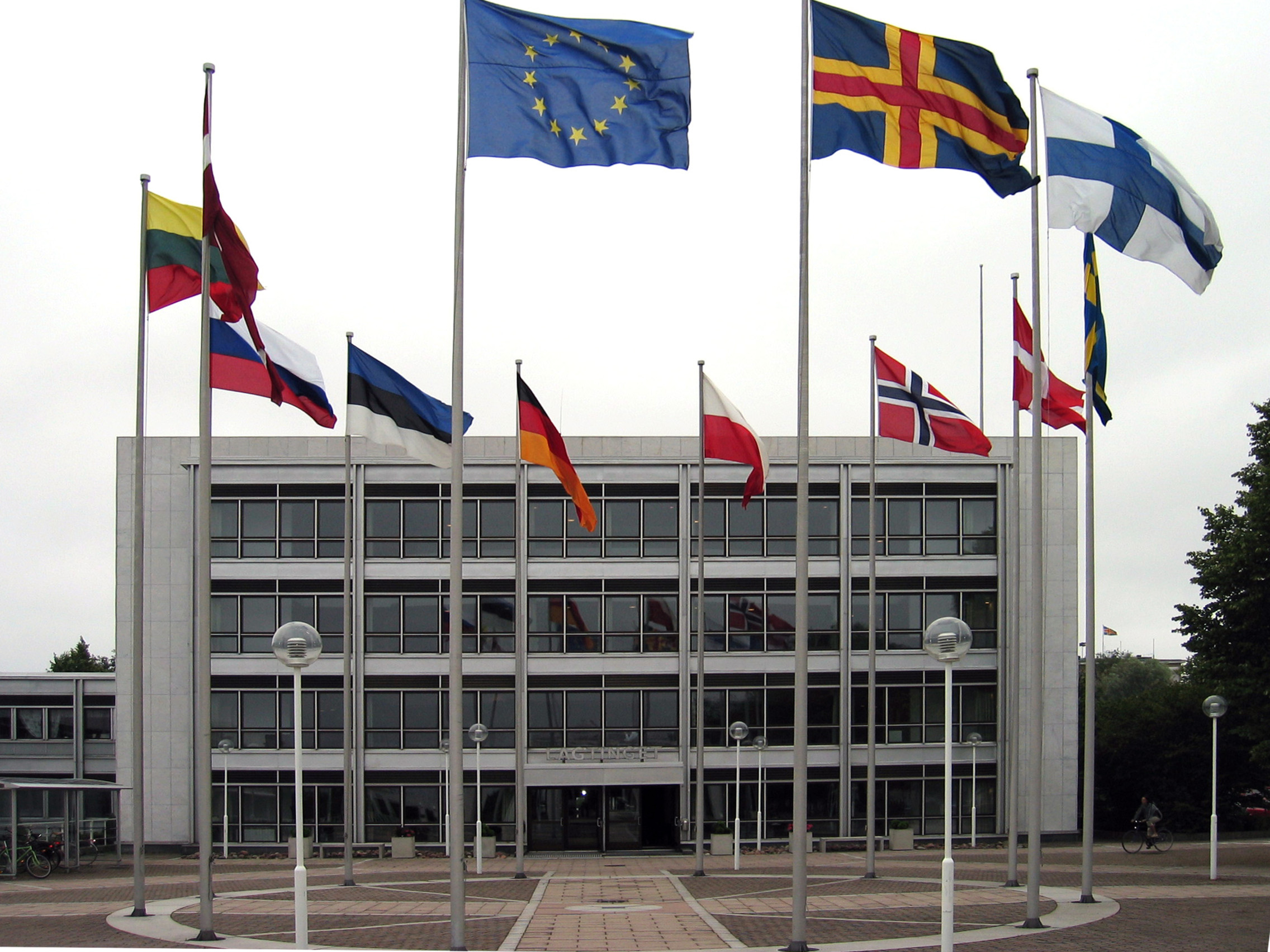
- Parliament building of Åland

Website
- http://www.lagtinget.ax

The Parliament of Åland is the unicameral legislature of Åland, an autonomous, Swedish-speaking region of Finland. It has 30 members and enacts legislation for Åland while overseeing the regional government.

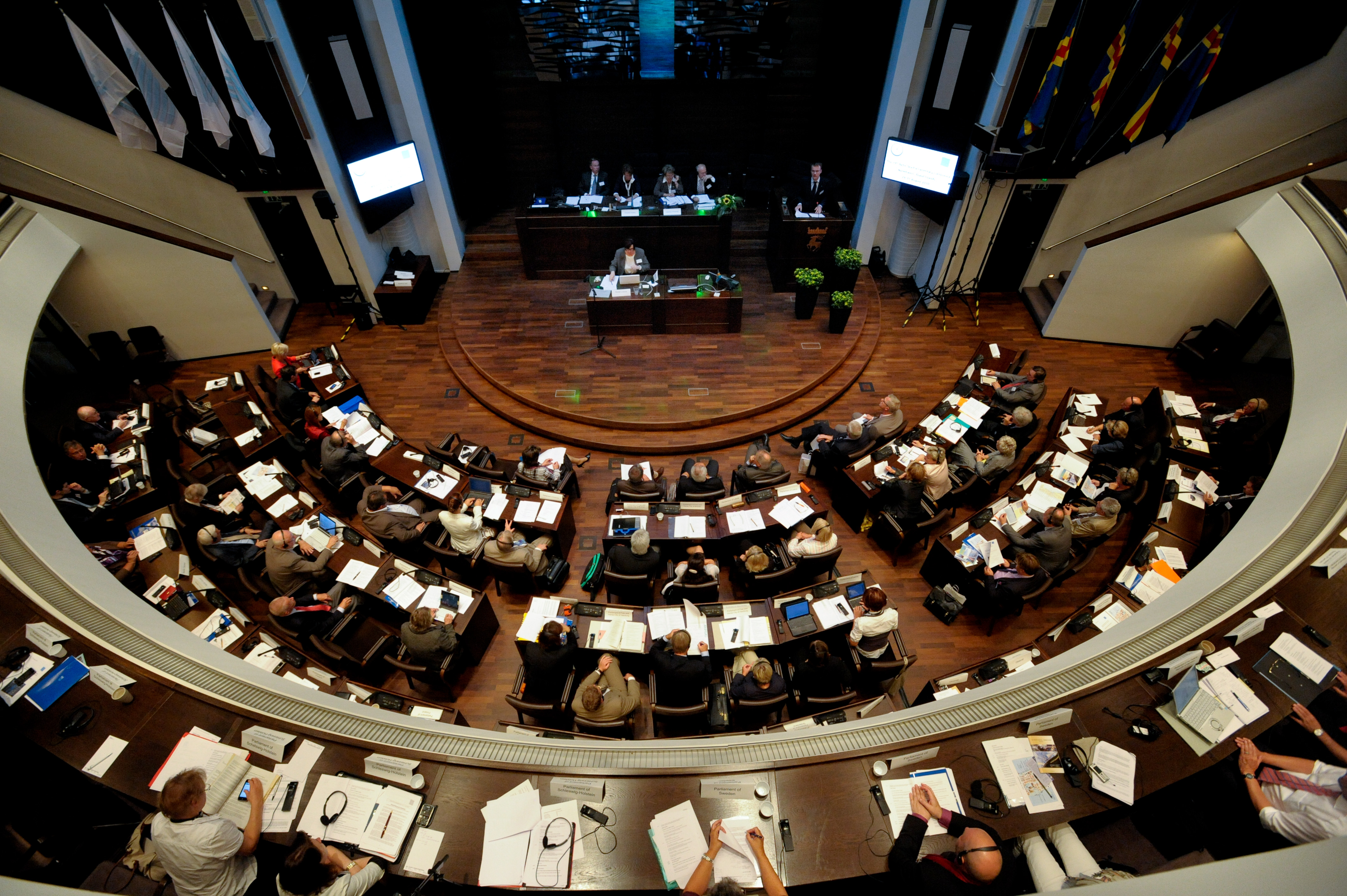
Plenary chamber of the Parliament of Åland

== Committees ==
Most parliamentary work is carried out by three standing committees:

- Legal Affairs and Culture
- Economic and Monetary Affairs
- Social Affairs and Local Environment

== Elections ==
Members are elected every four years using proportional representation and the d'Hondt method. All voters and candidates must be at least 18 years old and eligible in Åland.

== Latest election ==
For the latest results, see 2023 Ålandic legislative election.

== Election results by party (1979–2023) ==
Election	Seats										
Election	ÅC	LÅ	ÅS	FS	ObS	G	Åfg	ÅF	MS	ÅD	Hi
1979	14	9	3	4							
1983	11	9	5	5							
1987	9	8	4	5	2	2					
1991	10	7	4	6	3						
1995	9	8	4	6	3						
1999	9	9	3	4	4		1				
2003	7	7	6	4	3		1	2			
2007	8	10	3	3	4			2			
2011	7	6	6	4	4			3			
2015	7	7	5		3			2	5	1	
2019	9	6	3		4			1	4	1	2
2023	7	9	4		5				4		1

== See also ==
- Government of Åland
- List of speakers of the Parliament of Åland
- Municipalities of Åland
- Politics of Åland
- Parliament of Finland
- Government of Finland
- Åland State Provincial Office
- Swedish Assembly of Finland
- Politics of Finland
- Ting
