= Freeminded Co-operation =

Freeminded Co-operation Frisinnad Samverkan
- Founded: 1967
- Dissolved: 2015
- Merged into: Moderate Coalition for Åland
- Headquarters: Parliament of Åland, Strandgatan 37, 22100 Mariehamn
- Youth wing: Samlad Åländsk Ungdom
- Ideology: Liberalism; Liberal conservatism
- Political position: Centre-right
- European Parliament group: ALDE (co-operation with Swedish People's Party of Finland)
- Nordic affiliation: Conservative Group
- Colours: Blue

Website
- www.moderaterna.ax

The Freeminded Co-operation (Swedish: Frisinnad Samverkan), known from 2011 to 2015 as Moderates of Åland (Swedish: Moderaterna på Åland), was a liberal-conservative political party on the Åland Islands.

The party changed its name from Freeminded Co-operation to Moderates of Åland in April 2011. In 2015, the party merged with members of the Non-aligned Coalition to form the Moderate Coalition for Åland. The party leader from 2011 until its dissolution was Johan Ehn.

== Election results ==
=== Parliament of Åland (Lagting) ===
Election	Votes	%	Seats	+/-	Government
1967	1,149	14.96	4 / 30	New	—
1971	1,207	13.84	4 / 30	Steady	—
1975	1,027	10.82	3 / 30	▼1	—
1979	1,295	13.87	4 / 30	▲1	—
1983	1,727	16.61	5 / 30	▲1	—
1987	1,839	17.25	5 / 30	Steady	Coalition
1991	2,130	19.81	6 / 30	▲1	Coalition
1995	2,310	20.58	6 / 30	Steady	Coalition
1999	1,750	14.52	4 / 30	▼2	Coalition (1999–2001)
1999	1,750	14.52	4 / 30	▼2	Opposition (2001–2003)
2003	1,677	13.58	4 / 30	Steady	Coalition (2003–2004)
2003	1,677	13.58	4 / 30	Steady	Opposition (2004–2007)
2007	1,233	9.61	3 / 30	▼1	Opposition
2011	1,810	13.95	4 / 30	▲1	Coalition

== See also ==
- Lemland List
