= Åland Centre =

Åland Centre Åländsk Center (Swedish) Ahvenanmaan keskusta (Finnish)
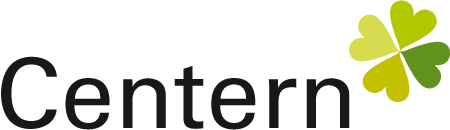
- Chairperson: Annika Hambrudd
- First deputy chair: Anna Holmström
- Second deputy chair: Mathias Sandberg
- Founded: 1976
- Headquarters: Ålands Lagting, Strandgatan 37, 22100 Mariehamn
- Youth wing: Åländsk Ungcenter
- Women's wing: Centerkvinnorna
- Ideology: Liberalism; Agrarianism (Nordic)
- Political position: Centre
- European affiliation: Alliance of Liberals and Democrats for Europe Party (co-operation with the Swedish People's Party of Finland)
- Nordic affiliation: Centre Group
- Colours: Green
- Eduskunta (Åland Coalition): 1 / 1
- Lagtinget: 7 / 30
- Municipalities: 36 / 208

Website
- www.centern.ax

The Åland Centre (Swedish: Åländsk Center) is an agrarian-centrist political party on the Åland Islands. The party was founded by Karl-Anders Bergman in 1976.

The party has had four premiers of Åland including: Folke Woivalin (1979–1988), Ragnar Erlandsson (1991–1995), Roger Nordlund (1999–2007), and Veronica Thörnroos (2019–2023).

The party is affiliated with the Alliance of Liberals and Democrats for Europe. Mats Löfström, the current MP of Åland in the Finnish parliament, represents Åland Centre.

== History ==
The party was founded in 1976, when the Swedish Centre Party was the largest non-socialist party in Sweden and hold the position of Prime Minister. Åland Centre then created its youth wing, 'Young Centre', in 1976, and a women's organization in 1988. In the 1979 Ålandic legislative election, the party won 42.3% of the popular vote at its first election, becoming the largest party in the Lagting. Subsequently, the party had emerged as the largest party in Åland in majority of the Ålandic elections.

The party lost its longstanding position as the largest party in 2015 Ålandic legislative election. Ever since, it has been positioning itself as the opponent of centralization and municipal reforms, opposing the governmental proposals to reduce the number of municipalities from 16 to 4. The party maintains its dominance in the rural and archipelago municipalities of Åland.

== Election results ==
=== Parliament of Åland (Lagting) ===
Election	Votes	%	Seats	+/-	Place	Government
1979	3,954	42.34	14 / 30	New	1st	—N/a
1983	3,704	35.62	11 / 30	▼3	1st	—N/a
1987	3,063	28.73	9 / 30	▼2	1st	Coalition
1991	3,242	30.16	10 / 30	▲1	1st	Coalition
1995	3,118	27.78	9 / 30	▼1	1st	Coalition
1999	3,292	27.32	9 / 30	Steady	2nd	Coalition
2003	2,980	24.14	7 / 30	▼2	1st	Coalition
2007	3,107	24.23	8 / 30	▲1	2nd	Coalition
2011	3,068	23.65	7 / 30	▲1	1st	Coalition
2015	2,984	21.60	7 / 30	Steady	2nd	Opposition
2019	3,970	27.84	9 / 30	▲2	1st	Coalition
2023	1,757	21.24	7 / 30	▼2	2nd	Coalition
