= Åland Social Democrats =

Åland Social Democrats Ålands Socialdemokrater (Swedish) Ahvenanmaan sosiaalidemokraatit (Finnish)
- Chair: Arsim Zekaj
- First deputy chair: Jessy Eckerman
- Second deputy chair: Danielle Lindholm
- Founded: 1971
- Headquarters: Strandgatan 37, 22100 Mariehamn, Åland
- Youth wing: Rosenskotten
- Women's wing: Törnrosorna
- Ideology: Social democracy
- Political position: Centre-left
- Nordic affiliation: SAMAK
- Colours: Red
- Parliament of Åland (Lagtinget): 4 / 30

Website
- www.socialdemokraterna.ax

The Åland Social Democrats (Swedish: Ålands Socialdemokrater) are a social-democratic party in Åland. In the 2023 election, they won 12.82% of the vote and 4 seats, a gain of one.

The party was founded in 1971. Labour movement activity on the islands dates back to 1906, when the first workers’ associations were formed.

After Finland's independence 1917, the labour movement aligned more with the Swedish Social Democratic Party than with the Social Democratic Party of Finland. After the Second World War, it competed with the far-left Finnish People's Democratic League, which was for a time the largest political movement on the islands.

== Election results ==
Year	Seats	Votes	%
1975	5	1,371	14.4
1979	3	1,125	12.0
1983	5	1,717	16.5
1987	4	1,489	14.0
1991	4	1,564	14.5
1995	4	1,711	15.2
1999	3	1,427	11.8
2003	6	2,340	19.0
2007	3	1,513	11.8
2011	6	2,404	18.5
2015	5	2,188	17.4
2019	3	1,292	9.1
2023	4	1,032	12.82

== See also ==
- Politics of Finland
- List of political parties in Åland
- Social Democratic Party of Finland
