= Åland (parliamentary electoral district) =

Electoral district of the Parliament of Finland

- Ahvenanmaa
- Electoral District for the Parliament of Finland
- Location of Åland within Finland
- Municipality: List: Brändö; Eckerö; Finström; Föglö; Geta; Hammarland; Jomala; Kökar; Kumlinge; Lemland; Lumparland; Mariehamn; Saltvik; Sottunga; Sund; Vårdö
- Region: Åland
- Population: 30,422 (2022)
- Electorate: 28,236 (2023)
- Area: 1,585 km^{2} (2022)

Current Electoral District
- Created: 1948
- Seats: 1 (1948–present)
- Members of Parliament: Mats Löfström (FÅ)
- Created from: Turku Province South

Åland (Finnish: Ahvenanmaa) is one of the 13 electoral districts of the Parliament of Finland, the national legislature of Finland. The district was established in 1947 from parts of Turku Province South. It is conterminous with the autonomous region of Åland. The district currently elects one of the 200 members of the Parliament of Finland using the open party-list proportional representation electoral system. At the 2023 parliamentary election it had 28,236 registered electors.

== History ==
The electoral district of Åland was established in 1947 from parts of Turku Province South.

== Electoral system ==
Åland currently elects one of the 200 members of the Parliament of Finland using the open party-list proportional representation electoral system. Seats are allocated using the D'Hondt method.

== Election results ==
=== Summary ===
Election	Social Democrats S			Liberals L			Centre C			Moderates MS / M / FS			Non-Aligned ObS		
Election	Votes	%	Seats	Votes	%	Seats	Votes	%	Seats	Votes	%	Seats	Votes	%	Seats
2023	923	6.90%	0	386	2.88%	0	10,516	78.58%	1	550	4.11%	0	514	3.84%	0
2019							11,051	84.51%	1	589	4.50%	0			
2015	864	7.09%	0	1,277	10.48%	0	5,217	42.81%	1	242	1.99%	0			
2011	802	7.64%	0	872	8.30%	0	425	4.05%	0	1,085	10.33%	0	6,925	65.93%	1
2007	1,607	14.39%	0	4,024	36.03%	0	1,149	10.29%	0				4,388	39.29%	1
2003	2,904	24.92%	0	3,323	28.52%	0	1,118	9.60%	0	3,213	27.58%	1	1,093	9.38%	0
1999	924	8.82%	0	5,870	56.05%	1	3,037	29.00%	0	312	2.98%	0	329	3.14%	0
1995	909	9.18%	0	6,038	60.96%	1									
1991	940	10.06%	0			1	1,858	19.88%	0						
1987	1,092	11.62%	0	5,927	63.05%	1									
1983				5,754	60.84%	1	3,704	39.16%	0						
1979	1,992	21.12%	0	2,802	29.71%	0	3,451	36.59%	1	1,041	11.04%	0			

=== Detailed ===
==== 2020s ====
===== 2023 =====
Results of the 2023 parliamentary election held on 2 April 2023:

Candidate	Party		List		Candidate		List		
Candidate	Party		List		Votes	%	Votes	%	Seats
Mats Löfström	Åland Centre	C	For Åland (Centre, Liberals and Moderates)	FÅ	10,516	78.58%	11,452	85.57%	1
Wille Valve	Moderate Coalition for Åland	MS	For Åland (Centre, Liberals and Moderates)	FÅ	550	4.11%	11,452	85.57%	1
Sandra Listherby	Liberals for Åland	L	For Åland (Centre, Liberals and Moderates)	FÅ	386	2.88%	11,452	85.57%	1
Nina Fellman	Åland Social Democrats	S	Welfare and Equality (Social Democrats)	VJ	615	4.60%	923	6.90%	0
Henrik Löthman	Åland Social Democrats	S	Welfare and Equality (Social Democrats)	VJ	157	1.17%	923	6.90%	0
Kristine Dzene	Åland Social Democrats	S	Welfare and Equality (Social Democrats)	VJ	87	0.65%	923	6.90%	0
Arsim Zekaj	Åland Social Democrats	S	Welfare and Equality (Social Democrats)	VJ	64	0.48%	923	6.90%	0
Marcus Måtar	Non-aligned Coalition	ObS	Non-aligned Coalition	ObS	294	2.20%	514	3.84%	0
Ted Häggblom	Non-aligned Coalition	ObS	Non-aligned Coalition	ObS	98	0.73%	514	3.84%	0
Christian Wikström	Non-aligned Coalition	ObS	Non-aligned Coalition	ObS	96	0.72%	514	3.84%	0
Jannik Svensson	Non-aligned Coalition	ObS	Non-aligned Coalition	ObS	26	0.19%	514	3.84%	0
Simon Holmström	Sustainable Initiative	HI	Sustainable Initiative	HI	157	1.17%	494	3.69%	0
Alfons Röblom	Sustainable Initiative	HI	Sustainable Initiative	HI	140	1.05%	494	3.69%	0
Pia Widén	Sustainable Initiative	HI	Sustainable Initiative	HI	109	0.81%	494	3.69%	0
Erika Scott	Sustainable Initiative	HI	Sustainable Initiative	HI	88	0.66%	494	3.69%	0
Valid votes					13,383	100.00%	13,383	100.00%	1
Rejected votes					127	0.94%			
Total polled					13,510	47.85%			
Registered electors					28,236				

Mats Löfström (FÅ) was elected.

==== 2010s ====
===== 2019 =====
Results of the 2019 parliamentary election held on 14 April 2019:

Candidate	Party		List		Candidate		List		
Candidate	Party		List		Votes	%	Votes	%	Seats
Mats Löfström	Åland Centre	C	For Åland (Centre, Liberals and Moderates)	FÅ	11,051	84.51%	11,640	89.02%	1
Johan Ehn	Moderate Coalition for Åland	MS	For Åland (Centre, Liberals and Moderates)	FÅ	589	4.50%	11,640	89.02%	1
Jessy Eckerman	Independent (Note: Jessy Eckerman was supported by the Åland Social Democrats at the 2019 parliamentary election.)		Independent		1,078	8.24%	1,078	8.24%	0
Stephan Toivonen	Ålandic Democracy	AD	Alternative for Åland	AFÅ	252	1.93%	358	2.74%	0
Birgitta Johansson	Future of Åland	ÅF	Alternative for Åland	AFÅ	106	0.81%	358	2.74%	0
Valid votes					13,076	100.00%	13,076	100.00%	1
Rejected votes					133	1.01%			
Total polled					13,209	47.75%			
Registered electors					27,664				

Mats Löfström (FÅ) was elected.

===== 2015 =====
Results of the 2015 parliamentary election held on 19 April 2015:

Candidate	Party		List		Candidate		List		
Candidate	Party		List		Votes	%	Votes	%	Seats
Mats Löfström	Åland Centre	C	Åland Coalition (Centre, Moderates and Social Democrats)	ÅS	5,217	42.81%	10,910	89.52%	1
Elisabeth Nauclér	Independent		Åland Coalition (Centre, Moderates and Social Democrats)	ÅS	4,587	37.64%	10,910	89.52%	1
Sara Kemetter	Åland Social Democrats	S	Åland Coalition (Centre, Moderates and Social Democrats)	ÅS	864	7.09%	10,910	89.52%	1
Cecilia Jansson	Moderates of Åland	M	Åland Coalition (Centre, Moderates and Social Democrats)	ÅS	242	1.99%	10,910	89.52%	1
Mats Perämaa	Liberals for Åland	L	Liberals for Åland	L	874	7.17%	1,277	10.48%	0
Julia Birney	Liberals for Åland	L	Liberals for Åland	L	296	2.43%	1,277	10.48%	0
Kent Eriksson	Liberals for Åland	L	Liberals for Åland	L	107	0.88%	1,277	10.48%	0
Valid votes					12,187	100.00%	12,187	100.00%	1
Rejected votes					292	2.34%			
Total polled					12,479	46.19%			
Registered electors					27,017				

Mats Löfström (ÅS) was elected.

===== 2011 =====
Results of the 2011 parliamentary election held on 17 April 2011:

Candidate	Party		List		Candidate		List		
Candidate	Party		List		Votes	%	Votes	%	Seats
Elisabeth Nauclér	Non-aligned Coalition	ObS	Åland Coalition (Centre, Future of Åland, Non-aligned Coalition and Social Democrats)	ÅS	6,925	65.93%	8,546	81.37%	1
Christian Beijar	Åland Social Democrats	S	Åland Coalition (Centre, Future of Åland, Non-aligned Coalition and Social Democrats)	ÅS	802	7.64%	8,546	81.37%	1
Henry Lindström	Åland Centre	C	Åland Coalition (Centre, Future of Åland, Non-aligned Coalition and Social Democrats)	ÅS	425	4.05%	8,546	81.37%	1
Axel Jonsson	Future of Åland	AF	Åland Coalition (Centre, Future of Åland, Non-aligned Coalition and Social Democrats)	ÅS	394	3.75%	8,546	81.37%	1
Johan Ehn	Moderates of Åland	M	Alliance for Åland (Liberals and Moderates)	AfÅ	845	8.05%	1,957	18.63%	0
Tony Asumaa	Liberals for Åland	L	Alliance for Åland (Liberals and Moderates)	AfÅ	736	7.01%	1,957	18.63%	0
Lennart Isaksson	Moderates of Åland	M	Alliance for Åland (Liberals and Moderates)	AfÅ	240	2.29%	1,957	18.63%	0
Eva Ekström-Andersen	Liberals for Åland	L	Alliance for Åland (Liberals and Moderates)	AfÅ	136	1.29%	1,957	18.63%	0
Valid votes					10,503	100.00%	10,503	100.00%	1
Rejected votes					251	2.33%			
Total polled					10,754	41.18%			
Registered electors					26,114				

Elisabeth Nauclér (ÅS) was elected.

==== 2000s ====
===== 2007 =====
Results of the 2007 parliamentary election held on 18 March 2007:

Candidate	Party		List		Candidate		List		
Candidate	Party		List		Votes	%	Votes	%	Seats
Elisabeth Nauclér	Non-aligned Coalition	ObS	Civic Alliance (Centre, Freeminded Co-operation, Liberals and Non-aligned Coalition)	BA	4,388	39.29%	9,561	85.61%	1
Roger Eriksson	Liberals for Åland	L	Civic Alliance (Centre, Freeminded Co-operation, Liberals and Non-aligned Coalition)	BA	4,024	36.03%	9,561	85.61%	1
Magnus Lundberg	Åland Centre	C	Civic Alliance (Centre, Freeminded Co-operation, Liberals and Non-aligned Coalition)	BA	1,149	10.29%	9,561	85.61%	1
Barbro Sundback	Åland Social Democrats	S	Åland Social Democrats	S	756	6.77%	1,607	14.39%	0
Camilla Gunell	Åland Social Democrats	S	Åland Social Democrats	S	395	3.54%	1,607	14.39%	0
Kaj Grundström	Åland Social Democrats	S	Åland Social Democrats	S	340	3.04%	1,607	14.39%	0
Martin Nilsson	Åland Social Democrats	S	Åland Social Democrats	S	116	1.04%	1,607	14.39%	0
Valid votes					11,168	100.00%	11,168	100.00%	1
Rejected votes					348	3.02%			
Total polled					11,516	45.86%			
Registered electors					25,111				

Elisabeth Nauclér (BA) was elected.

===== 2003 =====
Results of the 2003 parliamentary election held on 16 March 2003:

Candidate	Party		List		Candidate		List		
Candidate	Party		List		Votes	%	Votes	%	Seats
Roger Jansson	Freeminded Co-operation	FS	For Åland (Freeminded Co-operation and Non-aligned Coalition)	FÅ	3,125	26.82%	4,306	36.96%	1
Bert Häggblom	Non-aligned Coalition	ObS	For Åland (Freeminded Co-operation and Non-aligned Coalition)	FÅ	735	6.31%	4,306	36.96%	1
Gun-Mari Lindholm	Non-aligned Coalition	ObS	For Åland (Freeminded Co-operation and Non-aligned Coalition)	FÅ	358	3.07%	4,306	36.96%	1
Nina Danielsson	Freeminded Co-operation	FS	For Åland (Freeminded Co-operation and Non-aligned Coalition)	FÅ	88	0.76%	4,306	36.96%	1
Roger Eriksson	Liberals for Åland	L	Security and Development (Liberals)		1,874	16.08%	3,323	28.52%	0
Folke Sjölund	Liberals for Åland	L	Security and Development (Liberals)		834	7.16%	3,323	28.52%	0
Raija-Liisa Eklöw	Liberals for Åland	L	Security and Development (Liberals)		520	4.46%	3,323	28.52%	0
Inger Rosenberg-Mattsson	Liberals for Åland	L	Security and Development (Liberals)		95	0.82%	3,323	28.52%	0
Barbro Sundback	Åland Social Democrats	S	Åland Social Democrats	S	2,471	21.21%	2,904	24.92%	0
Carina Aaltonen	Åland Social Democrats	S	Åland Social Democrats	S	166	1.42%	2,904	24.92%	0
Cecilia Mattsson	Åland Social Democrats	S	Åland Social Democrats	S	158	1.36%	2,904	24.92%	0
Leena Raitanen	Åland Social Democrats	S	Åland Social Democrats	S	109	0.94%	2,904	24.92%	0
Britt Lundberg	Åland Centre	C	Commitment and Self-Government (Centre)		745	6.39%	1,118	9.60%	0
Runar Karlsson	Åland Centre	C	Commitment and Self-Government (Centre)		265	2.27%	1,118	9.60%	0
Tom Blomberg	Åland Centre	C	Commitment and Self-Government (Centre)		63	0.54%	1,118	9.60%	0
Erica Sjöström	Åland Centre	C	Commitment and Self-Government (Centre)		45	0.39%	1,118	9.60%	0
Valid votes					11,651	100.00%	11,651	100.00%	1
Rejected votes					299	2.50%			
Total polled					11,950	47.98%			
Registered electors					24,908				

Roger Jansson (FÅ) was elected.

==== 1990s ====
===== 1999 =====
Results of the 1999 parliamentary election held on 21 March 1999:

Candidate	Party		List		Candidate		List		
Candidate	Party		List		Votes	%	Votes	%	Seats
Gunnar Jansson	Liberals for Åland	L	Middle List (Liberals)	ML	5,150	49.18%	5,870	56.05%	1
Viveca Eriksson	Liberals for Åland	L	Middle List (Liberals)	ML	297	2.84%	5,870	56.05%	1
Raija-Liisa Eklöw	Liberals for Åland	L	Middle List (Liberals)	ML	267	2.55%	5,870	56.05%	1
Olof Öström	Liberals for Åland	L	Middle List (Liberals)	ML	156	1.49%	5,870	56.05%	1
Ragnar Erlandsson	Åland Centre	C	For Åland (Centre, Freeminded Co-operation and Non-aligned Coalition)	FÅ	2,672	25.52%	3,678	35.12%	0
Gun Carlsson	Åland Centre	C	For Åland (Centre, Freeminded Co-operation and Non-aligned Coalition)	FÅ	365	3.49%	3,678	35.12%	0
Gun-Mari Lindholm	Non-aligned Coalition	ObS	For Åland (Centre, Freeminded Co-operation and Non-aligned Coalition)	FÅ	329	3.14%	3,678	35.12%	0
Johan Rothberg	Freeminded Co-operation	FS	For Åland (Centre, Freeminded Co-operation and Non-aligned Coalition)	FÅ	312	2.98%	3,678	35.12%	0
Lasse Wiklöf	Åland Social Democrats	S	Åland Social Democrats	S	447	4.27%	924	8.82%	0
Barbro Sundback	Åland Social Democrats	S	Åland Social Democrats	S	300	2.86%	924	8.82%	0
Anna-Helena Sjöblom	Åland Social Democrats	S	Åland Social Democrats	S	91	0.87%	924	8.82%	0
Henrik Lagerberg	Åland Social Democrats	S	Åland Social Democrats	S	86	0.82%	924	8.82%	0
Valid votes					10,472	100.00%	10,472	100.00%	1
Rejected votes					149	1.40%			
Total polled					10,621	43.13%			
Registered electors					24,623				

Gunnar Jansson (ML) was elected.

===== 1995 =====
Results of the 1995 parliamentary election held on 19 March 1995:

Candidate	Party		List		Candidate		List		
Candidate	Party		List		Votes	%	Votes	%	Seats
Gunnar Jansson	Liberals for Åland	L	Liberals for Åland	L	5,199	52.49%	6,038	60.96%	1
Gunnevi Nordman	Liberals for Åland	L	Liberals for Åland	L	353	3.56%	6,038	60.96%	1
Lotta Wickström-Johansson	Liberals for Åland	L	Liberals for Åland	L	271	2.74%	6,038	60.96%	1
Sune Eriksson	Liberals for Åland	L	Liberals for Åland	L	215	2.17%	6,038	60.96%	1
Per Ekström			Civic Coalition (Centre, Freeminded Co-operation and Non-aligned Coalition)	BS	1,533	15.48%	2,958	29.86%	0
Kerstin Alm	Åland Centre	C	Civic Coalition (Centre, Freeminded Co-operation and Non-aligned Coalition)	BS	1,168	11.79%	2,958	29.86%	0
Airi Pettersson			Civic Coalition (Centre, Freeminded Co-operation and Non-aligned Coalition)	BS	161	1.63%	2,958	29.86%	0
Rolf Nordlund			Civic Coalition (Centre, Freeminded Co-operation and Non-aligned Coalition)	BS	96	0.97%	2,958	29.86%	0
Lasse Wiklöf	Åland Social Democrats	S	Åland Social Democrats	S	668	6.74%	909	9.18%	0
Anna-Helena Sjöblom	Åland Social Democrats	S	Åland Social Democrats	S	241	2.43%	909	9.18%	0
Valid votes					9,905	100.00%	9,905	100.00%	1
Rejected votes					80	0.80%			
Total polled					9,985	40.66%			
Registered electors					24,557				

Gunnar Jansson (L) was elected.

===== 1991 =====
Results of the 1991 parliamentary election held on 17 March 1991:

Candidate	Party		List		Candidate		List		
Candidate	Party		List		Votes	%	Votes	%	Seats
Gunnar Jansson	Liberals for Åland	L	List C (Freeminded Co-operation, Greens, Liberals and Non-aligned Coalition)	LC	5,753	61.57%	6,546	70.06%	1
Karl-Göran Eriksson	Freeminded Co-operation	FS	List C (Freeminded Co-operation, Greens, Liberals and Non-aligned Coalition)	LC	409	4.38%	6,546	70.06%	1
Mirjam Öberg	Liberals for Åland	L	List C (Freeminded Co-operation, Greens, Liberals and Non-aligned Coalition)	LC	289	3.09%	6,546	70.06%	1
Ulf Eklund			List C (Freeminded Co-operation, Greens, Liberals and Non-aligned Coalition)	LC	95	1.02%	6,546	70.06%	1
Olof Salmén	Åland Centre	C	Åland Centre	C	790	8.45%	1,858	19.88%	0
Ragnar Erlandsson	Åland Centre	C	Åland Centre	C	606	6.49%	1,858	19.88%	0
Göran Bengtz	Åland Centre	C	Åland Centre	C	316	3.38%	1,858	19.88%	0
Runa Lisa Jansson	Åland Centre	C	Åland Centre	C	146	1.56%	1,858	19.88%	0
Lasse Wiklöf	Åland Social Democrats	S	Åland Social Democrats	S	536	5.74%	940	10.06%	0
Barbro Sundback	Åland Social Democrats	S	Åland Social Democrats	S	231	2.47%	940	10.06%	0
Jutta Lemberg-Lindqvist	Åland Social Democrats	S	Åland Social Democrats	S	111	1.19%	940	10.06%	0
Kurt Gustafsson	Åland Social Democrats	S	Åland Social Democrats	S	62	0.66%	940	10.06%	0
Valid votes					9,344	100.00%	9,344	100.00%	1
Blank votes					94	0.99%			
Rejected Votess – Other					28	0.30%			
Total polled					9,466	38.47%			
Registered electors					24,605				

Gunnar Jansson (LC) was elected.

==== 1980s ====
===== 1987 =====
Results of the 1987 parliamentary election held on 15 and 16 March 1987:

Candidate	Party		List		Candidate		List		
Candidate	Party		List		Votes	%	Votes	%	Seats
Gunnar Jansson	Liberals for Åland	L	List A (Liberals and Social Democrats)	LA	5,927	63.05%	7,019	74.66%	1
Susanne Eriksson	Åland Social Democrats	S	List A (Liberals and Social Democrats)	LA	1,092	11.62%	7,019	74.66%	1
Anders Eriksson	Åland Centre	C	Lits B / Civic Alternative (Centre and Freeminded Co-operation)	BA	967	10.29%	1,843	19.60%	0
Mikael Lönnqvist			Lits B / Civic Alternative (Centre and Freeminded Co-operation)	BA	408	4.34%	1,843	19.60%	0
Johan Rothberg	Freeminded Co-operation	FS	Lits B / Civic Alternative (Centre and Freeminded Co-operation)	BA	268	2.85%	1,843	19.60%	0
Ingvar Björling	Åland Centre	C	Lits B / Civic Alternative (Centre and Freeminded Co-operation)	BA	200	2.13%	1,843	19.60%	0
Sten Sundman	Free Åland	FÅ	Independent		539	5.73%	539	5.73%	0
Valid votes					9,401	100.00%	9,401	100.00%	1
Rejected votes					106	1.11%			
Total polled					9,507	39.04%			
Registered electors					24,349				

Gunnar Jansson (LA) was elected.

===== 1983 =====
Results of the 1983 parliamentary election held on 20 and 21 March 1983:

Candidate	Party		List		Candidate		List		
Candidate	Party		List		Votes	%	Votes	%	Seats
Gunnar Jansson	Liberals for Åland	L	List 3	L3	5,754	60.84%	5,754	60.84%	1
Gunnar Häggblom	Åland Centre	C	List 2	L2	3,704	39.16%	3,704	39.16%	0
Valid votes					9,458	100.00%	9,458	100.00%	1
Rejected votes					112	1.17%			
Total polled					9,570	39.72%			
Registered electors					24,095				

Gunnar Jansson (L3) was elected.

==== 1970s ====
===== 1979 =====
Results of the 1979 parliamentary election held on 18 and 19 March 1979:

Candidate	Party		List		Candidate		List		
Candidate	Party		List		Votes	%	Votes	%	Seats
Gunnar Häggblom	Åland Centre	C	Åland Coalition	AS	3,451	36.59%	9,286	98.45%	1
Alarik Häggblom	Liberals for Åland	L	Åland Coalition	AS	2,802	29.71%	9,286	98.45%	1
Lasse Wiklöf	Åland Social Democrats	S	Åland Coalition	AS	1,992	21.12%	9,286	98.45%	1
Jan-Erik Lindfors	Freeminded Co-operation	FS	Åland Coalition	AS	1,041	11.04%	9,286	98.45%	1
Gunnar Johansson	Finnish People's Democratic League	SKDL	Finnish People's Democratic League	SKDL	146	1.55%	146	1.55%	0
Valid votes					9,432	100.00%	9,432	100.00%	1
Rejected votes					36	0.38%			
Total polled					9,468	39.01%			
Registered electors					24,269				

Gunnar Häggblom (AS) was elected.

===== 1975 =====
Results of the 1975 parliamentary election held on 21 and 22 September 1975:

Candidate	List		Candidate		List		
Candidate	List		Votes	%	Votes	%	Seats
Evald Häggblom	Åland Coalition	AS	5,836	61.55%	9,482	100.00%	1
Folke Woivalin	Åland Coalition	AS	3,646	38.45%	9,482	100.00%	1
Valid votes			9,482	100.00%	9,482	100.00%	1
Rejected votes			116	1.21%			
Total polled			9,598	39.82%			
Registered electors			24,103				

Evald Häggblom (AS) was elected.

===== 1972 =====
Results of the 1972 parliamentary election held on 2 and 3 January 1972:

Candidate	List		Candidate		List		
Candidate	List		Votes	%	Votes	%	Seats
Evald Häggblom	Swedish People's Party of Finland	SFP	5,189	67.64%	5,189	67.64%	1
Tage Boman	Åland Coalition	AS	2,072	27.01%	2,483	32.36%	0
Sven Lemberg	Åland Coalition	AS	411	5.36%	2,483	32.36%	0
Valid votes			7,672	67.64%	7,672	67.64%	1
Rejected votes			34	0.44%			
Total polled			7,706	51.50%			
Registered electors			14,962				

Evald Häggblom (SFP) was elected.

===== 1970 =====
Results of the 1970 parliamentary election held on 15 and 16 March 1970:

Candidate	List		Candidate		List		
Candidate	List		Votes	%	Votes	%	Seats
Evald Häggblom	Swedish People's Party of Finland	SFP	6,857	76.44%	6,857	76.44%	1
Sven Lemberg	Åland Coalition	AS	936	10.43%	1,079	12.03%	0
Olof Lindström	Åland Coalition	AS	143	1.59%	1,079	12.03%	0
Elis Andersson	Independent		890	9.92%	890	9.92%	0
Rickard Lindroth	Finnish People's Democratic League	SKDL	145	1.62%	145	1.62%	0
Valid votes			8,971	100.00%	8,971	100.00%	1
Rejected votes			28	0.31%			
Total polled			8,999	60.94%			
Registered electors			14,767				

Evald Häggblom (SFP) was elected.

==== 1960s ====
===== 1966 =====
Results of the 1966 parliamentary election held on 20 and 21 March 1966:

Candidate	List		Candidate		List		
Candidate	List		Votes	%	Votes	%	Seats
Evald Häggblom	Åland Coalition	AS	3,858	54.20%	6,856	96.32%	1
Elis Andersson	Åland Coalition	AS	2,998	42.12%	6,856	96.32%	1
Rickard Lindroth	Finnish People's Democratic League	SKDL	261	3.67%	261	3.67%	0
	Write-in lists		1	0.01%	1	0.01%	0
Valid votes			7,118	100.00%	7,118	100.00%	1
Blank votes			2	0.03%			
Rejected Votess – Other			39	0.54%			
Total polled			7,159	50.67%			
Registered electors			14,129				

Evald Häggblom (AS) was elected.

===== 1962 =====
Results of the 1962 parliamentary election held on 4 and 5 February 1962:

Candidate	List		Candidate		List		
Candidate	List		Votes	%	Votes	%	Seats
Elis Andersson	Swedish People's Party of Finland	SFP	5,486	75.55%	6,966	95.94%	1
Harry Lindfors	Swedish People's Party of Finland	SFP	1,480	20.38%	6,966	95.94%	1
Rickard Lindroth	Finnish People's Democratic League	SKDL	295	4.06%	295	4.06%	0
Valid votes			7,261	100.00%	7,261	100.00%	1
Rejected votes			28	0.38%			
Total polled			7,289	51.58%			
Registered electors			14,131				

Elis Andersson (SFP) was elected.

==== 1950s ====
===== 1958 =====
Results of the 1958 parliamentary election held on 6 and 7 July 1958:

Candidate	List		Candidate		List		
Candidate	List		Votes	%	Votes	%	Seats
Arthur Larson	Swedish People's Party of Finland	SFP	3,345	60.96%	4,523	82.43%	1
Valter Nordas	Swedish People's Party of Finland	SFP	1,178	21.47%	4,523	82.43%	1
Tore Hansen	Social Democratic Party of Finland	SDP	676	12.32%	676	12.32%	0
Rickard Lindroth	Finnish People's Democratic League	SKDL	286	5.21%	286	5.21%	0
	Write-in lists		2	0.04%	2	0.04%	0
Valid votes			5,487	100.00%	5,487	100.00%	1
Rejected votes			29	0.53%			
Total polled			5,516	38.60%			
Registered electors			14,292				

Arthur Larson (SFP) was elected.

===== 1954 =====
Results of the 1954 parliamentary election held on 7 and 8 March 1954:

Candidate	List		Candidate		List		
Candidate	List		Votes	%	Votes	%	Seats
Arthur Larson	Swedish People's Party of Finland	SFP	4,367	93.79%	4,367	93.79%	1
Rauha Åkerblom	Finnish People's Democratic League	SKDL	277	5.95%	277	5.95%	0
	Write-in lists		12	0.26%	12	0.26%	0
Valid votes			4,656	100.00%	4,656	100.00%	1
Rejected votes			44	0.94%			
Total polled			4,700	33.12%			
Registered electors			14,190				

Arthur Larson (SFP) was elected.

===== 1951 =====
Results of the 1951 parliamentary election held on 1 and 2 July 1951:

Candidate	List		Candidate		List		
Candidate	List		Votes	%	Votes	%	Seats
Arthur Larson	Swedish People's Party of Finland	SFP	5,452	95.88%	5,452	95.88%	1
Rauha Åkerblom	Finnish People's Democratic League	SKDL	228	4.01%	228	4.01%	0
	Write-in lists		6	0.11%	6	0.11%	0
Valid votes			5,686	100.00%	5,686	100.00%	1
Rejected votes			81	1.40%			
Total polled			5,767	38.80%			
Registered electors			14,865				

Arthur Larson (SFP) was elected.

==== 1940s ====
===== 1948 =====
Results of the 1948 parliamentary election held on 1 and 2 July 1948:

Candidate	List		Candidate		List		
Candidate	List		Votes	%	Votes	%	Seats
Arthur Larson	Swedish People's Party of Finland	SFP			6,279	95.61%	1
Paul E. Paulson	Swedish People's Party of Finland	SFP			6,279	95.61%	1
Atos Wirtanen	Finnish People's Democratic League	SKDL	282	97.92%	282	4.29%	0
	Write-in lists		6	2.08%	6	0.09%	0
Valid votes			6,567	100.00%	6,567	100.00%	1
Rejected votes			60	17.24%			
Total polled			348	2.41%			
Registered electors			14,451				

Arthur Larson (SFP) was elected.
