= Sara Kemetter =

Ålandic politician

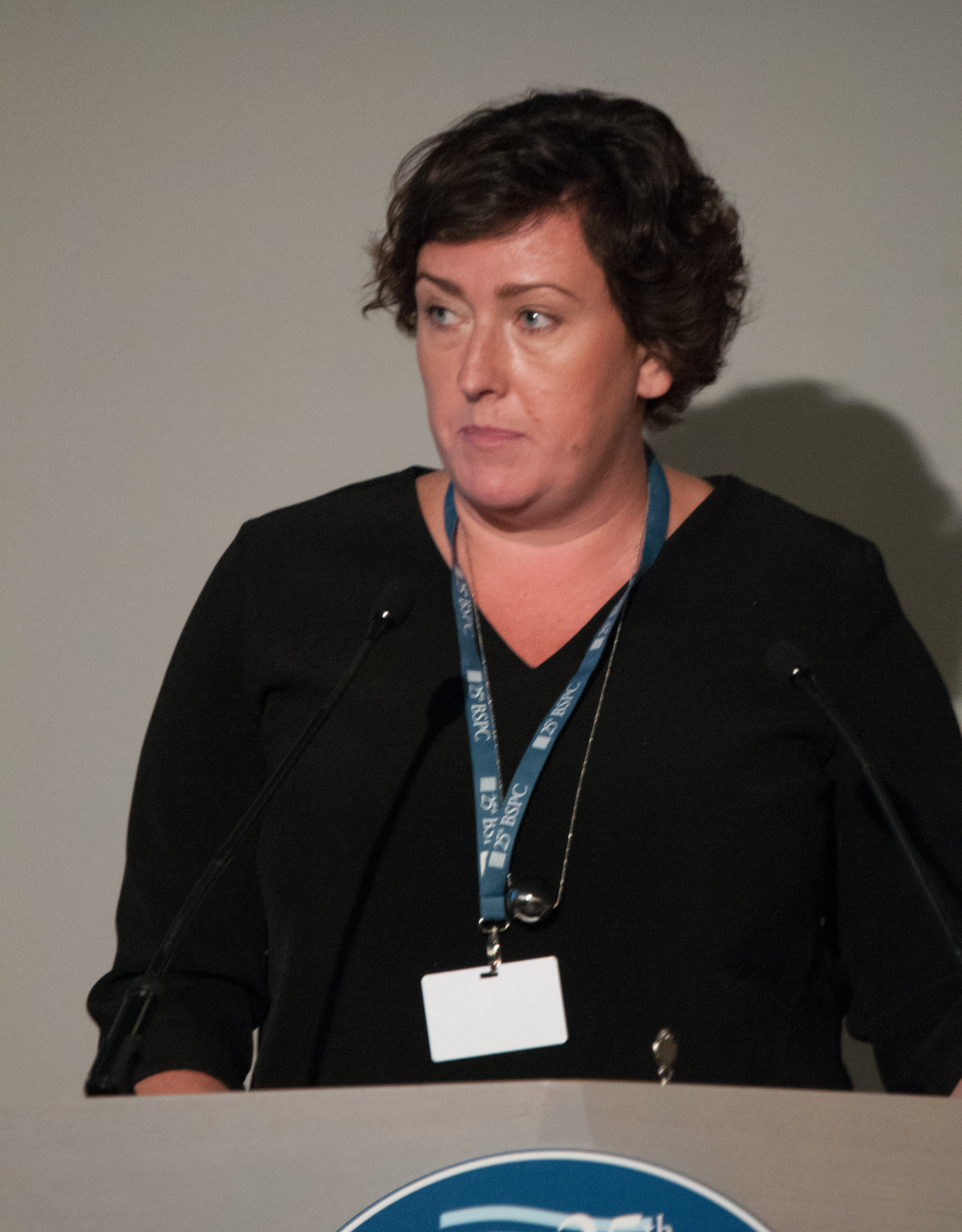
- Kemetter in August 2016

Member of the Parliament of Åland
- In office 1 November 2015 – 31 October 2019

Personal details
- Party: Social Democrats

Sara Kemetter is an Ålandic school teacher, politician and former member of the Parliament of Åland, the regional legislature of Åland, an autonomous region of Finland. A social democrat, she was a member of the legislature from November 2015 to October 2019. She was also a substitute member between November 2011 and October 2015 and for Nina Fellman between November 2019 and December 2019.

Kemetter is a trained pedagogue and school leader. She teaches at Ytternäs skola. She was a member of the Baltic Sea Parliamentary Conference from November 2015 to October 2019. She was chairman of the police board and vice-chairman of the high school board. She was chairman of Mariehamns Hamn Ab (Port of Mariehamn) and a board member of Paf (state-owned gaming operator) and Mariehamns Energi. She is member of the municipal council in Mariehamn.

Kemetter is married and has four children. She is chairman of the Åland Song and Music Association and musical director of Flera röster.

== Electoral history ==
Electoral history of Sara Kemetter
Election	Constituency	Party	List	Votes	Result
2011 Ålandic legislative	Åland	Åland Social Democrats		54	Not elected
2011 municipal	Mariehamn	Åland Social Democrats		92	Elected
2015 Finnish parliamentary	Åland	Åland Social Democrats	Åland Coalition	864	Not elected
2015 Ålandic legislative	Åland	Åland Social Democrats		88	Elected
2015 municipal	Mariehamn	Åland Social Democrats		121	Elected
2019 Ålandic legislative	Åland	Åland Social Democrats		89	Not elected
2019 municipal	Mariehamn	Åland Social Democrats		90	Elected
