= Barbro Sundback =

Ålandic politician (born 1945)

Speaker of the Parliament of Åland
- In office 1 November 2005 – 31 October 2007
- Preceded by: Viveka Eriksson
- Succeeded by: Gunnar Jansson

First Deputy Speaker of the Parliament of Åland
- In office 1 November 2003 – 31 October 2005
- Preceded by: Christer Jansson
- Succeeded by: Viveka Eriksson

Member of the Parliament of Åland
- In office 1 November 1979 – 31 October 2015

Personal details
- Born: 22 December 1945 (age 80) Vaasa, Finland
- Party: Social Democrats

Barbro Carol Sundback (born 22 December 1945) is an Ålandic psychologist, politician and former member of the Parliament of Åland, the regional legislature of Åland, an autonomous region of Finland. A social democrat, she was a member of the legislature from November 1979 to October 2015. She was also First Deputy Speaker from November 2003 and October 2005 and Speaker from November 2005 and October 2007.

== Early life and education ==
Sundback was born on 22 December 1945 in Vaasa. She is the daughter of Holger and Isabel Sundback. She moved to Mariehamn in 1958. She has a Master of Science degree in political science specialising in psychology (1972).

== Career ==
Sundback founded the Åland Islands Peace Institute in 1992 and served as its director/chairman of the board of directors 1992 to 2017. She is currently honorary chair of the institute.

Sundback was chairman of the Åland Social Democrats. She has been a member of the municipal council in Mariehamn since 1979. She is involved in numerous non-profit groups including the Åland branch of Emmaus, Cultural Association Katrina, Kvinnfolk folk music group and Feminist Academy in Åland. She took part in the Nordic women's peace marches in 1981, 1982 and 1983.

== Electoral history ==
Electoral history of Barbro Sundback
Election	Constituency	Party	Votes	Result
1991 Finnish parliamentary	Åland	Åland Social Democrats	231	Not elected
1999 Finnish parliamentary	Åland	Åland Social Democrats	300	Not elected
1999 Ålandic legislative	Åland	Åland Social Democrats	263	Elected
1999 municipal	Mariehamn	Åland Social Democrats	154	Elected
2003 Finnish parliamentary	Åland	Åland Social Democrats	2,471	Not elected
2003 Ålandic legislative	Åland	Åland Social Democrats	692	Elected
2003 municipal	Mariehamn	Åland Social Democrats	437	Elected
2007 Finnish parliamentary	Åland	Åland Social Democrats	756	Not elected
2007 Ålandic legislative	Åland	Åland Social Democrats	230	Elected
2007 municipal	Mariehamn	Åland Social Democrats	175	Elected
2011 Ålandic legislative	Åland	Åland Social Democrats	93	Elected
2011 municipal	Mariehamn	Åland Social Democrats	99	Elected
2015 Ålandic legislative	Åland	Åland Social Democrats	50	Not elected
2015 municipal	Mariehamn	Åland Social Democrats	84	Elected
2019 municipal	Mariehamn	Åland Social Democrats	228	Elected
