= Nina Fellman =

Ålandic politician (born 1964)

Member of the Parliament of Åland
- Incumbent
- Assumed office 11 December 2019
- In office 1 November 2015 – 24 November 2015
- Succeeded by: Tony Wikström

Minister of Administration and Local Government
- In office 25 November 2015 – 10 December 2019
- Preceded by: Gun-Mari Lindholm

Personal details
- Born: 16 December 1964 (age 61)
- Party: Social Democrats
- Education: Royal Academy of Turku
- Website: nfellman.blogspot.com

Nina Fellman (born 16 December 1964) is an Ålandic journalist, politician and member of the Parliament of Åland, the regional legislature of Åland, an autonomous region of Finland. A social democrat, she has been a member of the legislature since December 2019. She was briefly a member in November 2015 prior to serving as Minister of Administration and Local Government in the Government of Åland from November 2015 to December 2019.

Fellman was born on 16 December 1964. She has a master's degree in philosophy from the Royal Academy of Turku and is a journalist. She was editor-in-chief of Nya Åland for many years. She is member of the municipal council in Mariehamn and a board member of the Åland Islands Peace Institute.

Fellman is married to Robert Jansson and has four children - Frans, Hugo, Signe and Ivar. She lives in Mariehamn.

== Electoral history ==
Electoral history of Nina Fellman
Election	Constituency	Party	List	Votes	Result
2015 Ålandic legislative	Åland	Åland Social Democrats		417	Elected
2015 municipal	Mariehamn	Åland Social Democrats		313	Elected
2019 Ålandic legislative	Åland	Åland Social Democrats		178	Elected
2019 municipal	Mariehamn	Åland Social Democrats		78	Elected
2023 Finnish parliamentary	Åland	Åland Social Democrats	Welfare and Equality	615	Not elected
