= Eckerman =

Eckerman may refer to:

- Charlotte Eckerman (1759–1790), Swedish opera singer and actress
- Dan-Ola Eckerman (1963–1994), Finnish footballer
- Haley Eckerman (born 1992), American volleyball player
- Jessy Eckerman (born 1979), Ålandic politician
- Julie Eckerman (1765–1800), Swedish courtesan and spy
- Eckerman, Michigan
