= Jessy Eckerman =

Ålandic politician (born 1979)

Member of the Parliament of Åland
- Incumbent
- Assumed office 4 November 2019

Personal details
- Born: 27 April 1979 (age 46)
- Party: Social Democrats
- Website: jessystankar.wordpress.com

Jessica Eckerman-Hartvik (born 27 April 1979) is an Ålandic politician and member of the Parliament of Åland, the regional legislature of Åland, an autonomous region of Finland. A social democrat, she has been a member of the legislature since November 2019.

== Biography ==
Eckerman was born on 27 April 1979 and is a youth worker. She was a member of the Non-aligned Coalition for four years and its vice-chairman before leaving the party in 2015. She contested the 2019 Finnish parliamentary election as an independent candidate backed by the Social Democrats in Åland and came second with 8.2% of the votes. She is member of the municipal council in Mariehamn.

Eckerman has two sons.

Electoral history of Jessy Eckerman
Election	Constituency	Party	Votes	Result
2011 Ålandic legislative	Åland	Non-aligned Coalition	38	Not elected
2015 Ålandic legislative	Åland	Åland Social Democrats	46	Not elected
2015 municipal	Mariehamn	Åland Social Democrats	48	Not elected
2019 Finnish parliamentary	Åland	Independent	1,078	Not elected
2019 Ålandic legislative	Åland	Åland Social Democrats	102	Elected
2019 municipal	Mariehamn	Åland Social Democrats	106	Elected
