= Häggblom =

Häggblom is a surname. Notable people with the surname include:

- Evald Häggblom (1905–1976), Finnish schoolteacher and politician
- Robert Häggblom (born 1982), Finnish shot putter
