= Åland representation in the Parliament of Finland =

Åland is represented by a single seat in the Parliament of Finland. While the rest of the parliament is elected by proportional representation in multi-member constituencies, Åland forms its own single-member constituency. Elections for Åland’s representative therefore follow a first-past-the-post (FPTP) model.

If the Åland seat becomes vacant, a replacement is selected using the d'Hondt method. If no replacement candidate is available, a new election must be held. In other elections, such as presidential elections or elections to the European Parliament, Finland, including Åland, forms a single electoral district.

== History ==
Åland gained its own parliamentary seat in 1948. Since then, the islands have been represented by the Åland Coalition, an alliance of the major political parties in Åland formed to contest national elections. In parliament, the representative usually sits with the Swedish People's Party.

== List of Åland representatives ==
Representative	Term
Arthur Larson	1948–1959
Elis Andersson	1959–1966
Evald Häggblom	1966–1976
Gunnar Häggblom	1976–1983
Gunnar Jansson	1983–2003
Roger Jansson	2003–2007
Elisabeth Nauclér	2007–2015
Mats Löfström	2015–present
