= 1966 Finnish parliamentary election =

General election

← 1962	20–21 March 1966	1970 →

All 200 seats in the Parliament of Finland 101 seats needed for a majority
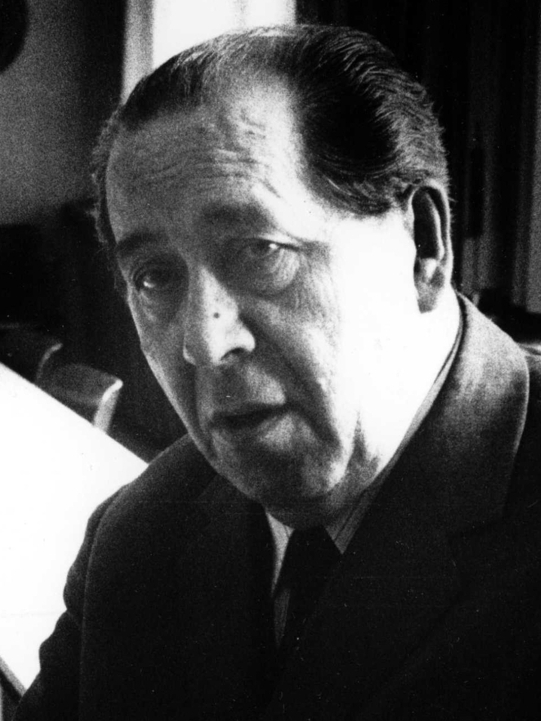

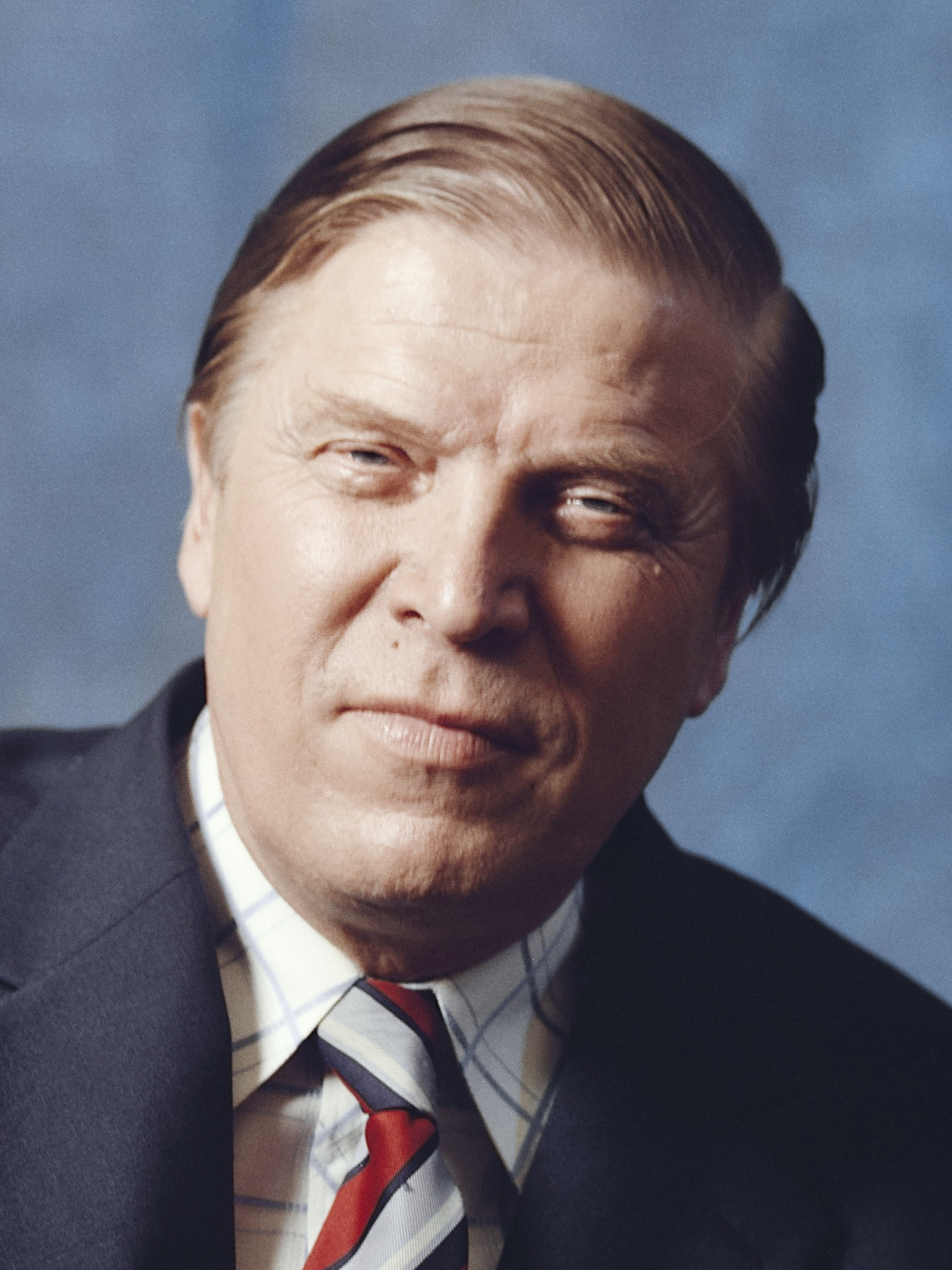

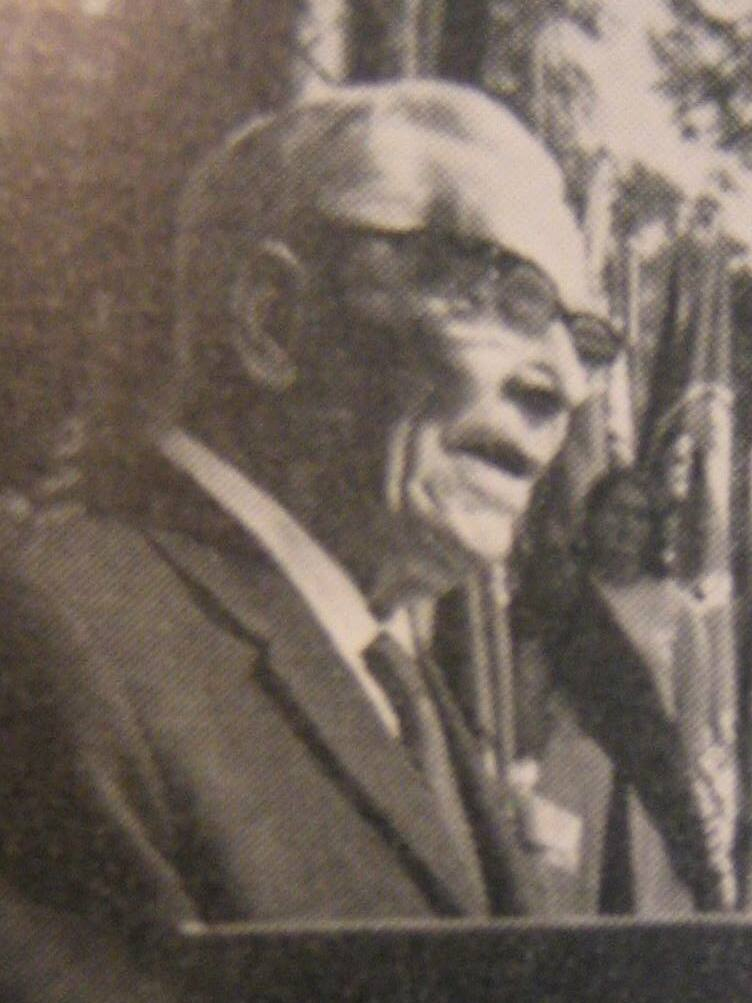

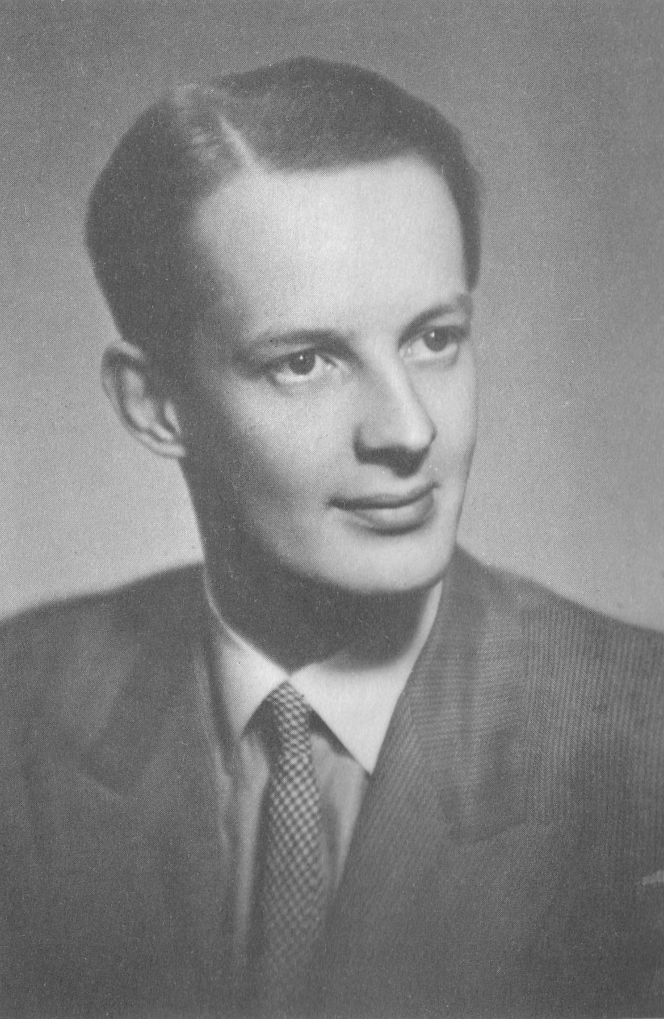

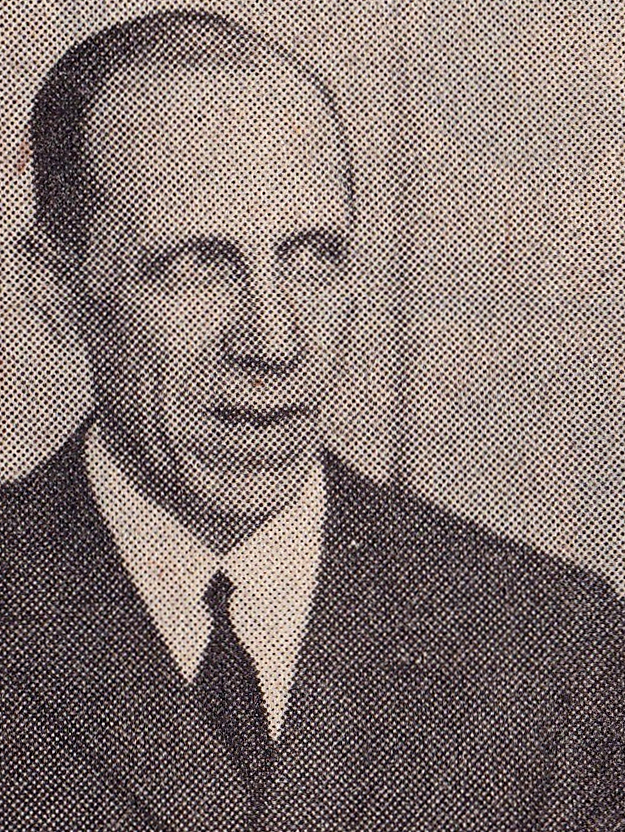

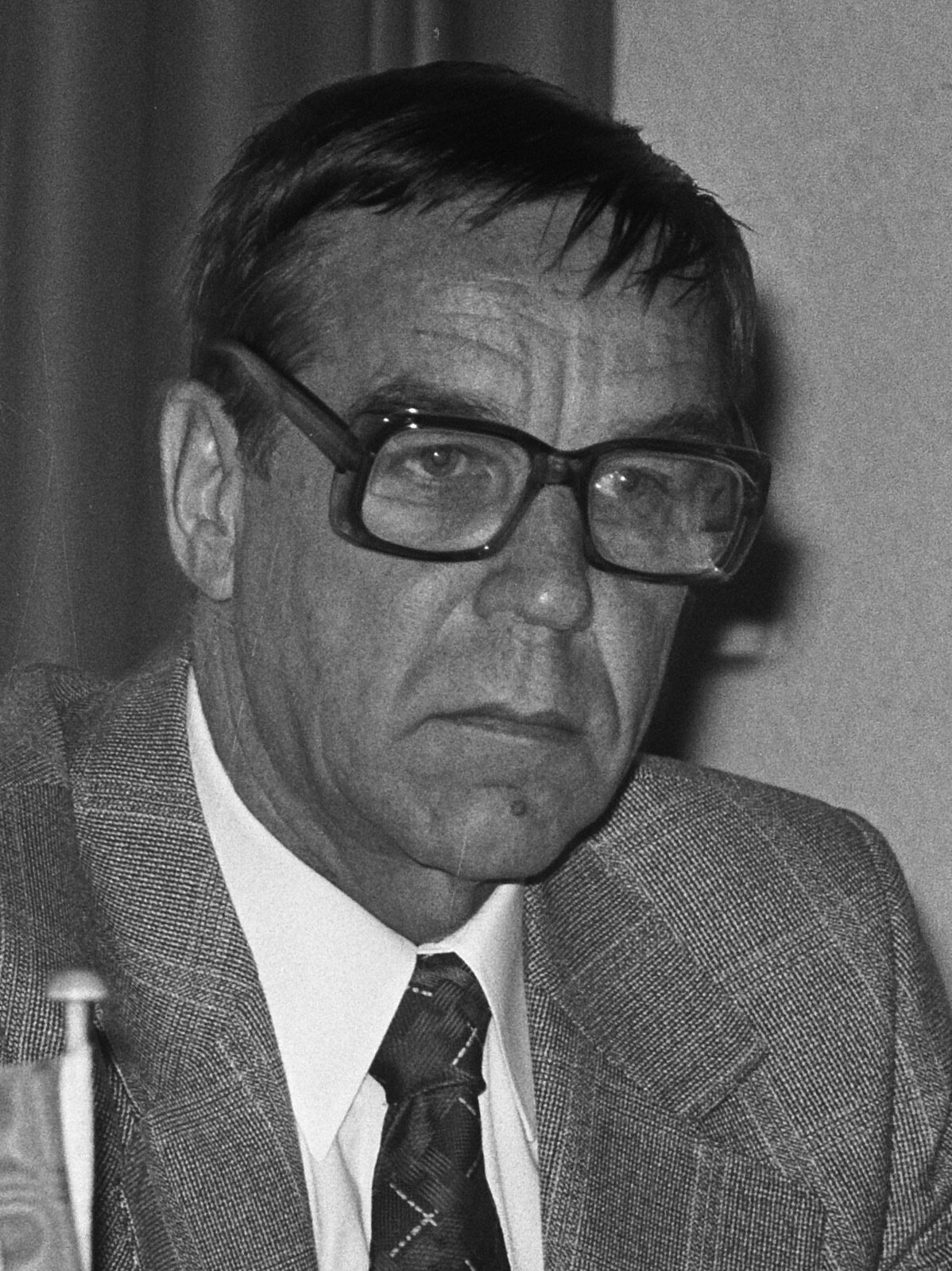

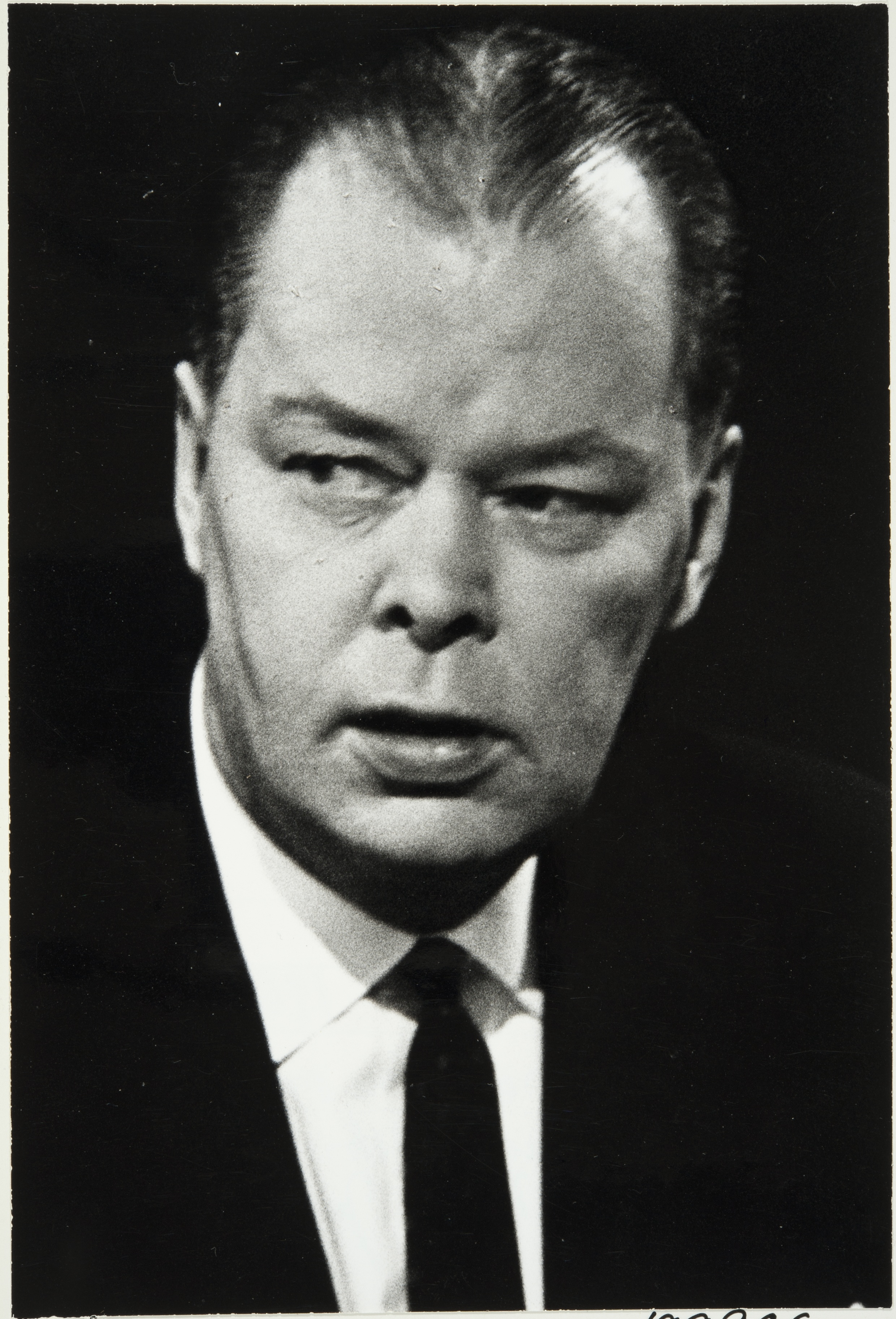

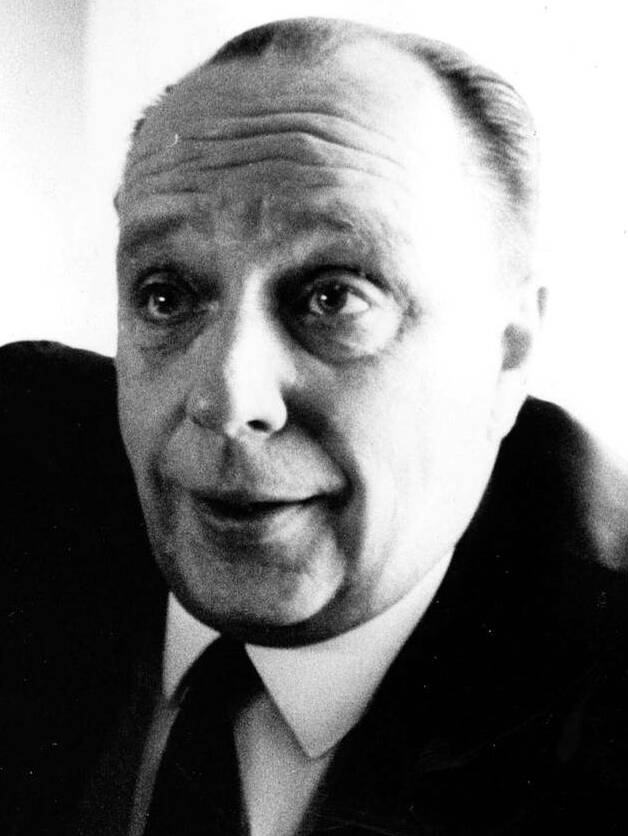
	First party	Second party	Third party
Leader	Rafael Paasio	Johannes Virolainen	Kusti Kulo
Party	SDP	Centre	SKDL
Last election	19.50%, 38 seats	22.95%, 53 seats	22.02%, 47 seats
Seats won	55	49	41
Seat change	▲17	▼4	▼6
Popular vote	645,339	503,047	502,374
Percentage	27.23%	21.23%	21.20%
Swing	▲7.73pp	▼1.72pp	▼0.82pp
	Fourth party	Fifth party	Sixth party
Leader	Juha Rihtniemi	Lars Erik Taxell	Mikko Juva
Party	National Coalition	RKP	Liberal People's
Last election	15.06%, 32 seats	6.11%, 13 seats	6.86%, 14 seats
Seats won	26	11	9
Seat change	▼6	▼2	▼5
Popular vote	326,928	134,831	153,259
Percentage	13.79%	5.69%	6.47%
Swing	▼1.27pp	▼0.42pp	▲0.39p
	Seventh party	Eighth party	Ninth party
Leader	Aarre Simonen	Veikko Vennamo
Party	TPSL	Smallholders' Party	ÅS
Last election	4.36%, 2 seats	2.16%, 0 seats	0.32%, 1 seat
Seats won	7	1	1
Seat change	▲5	▲1	Steady
Popular vote	61,274	24,351	7,118
Percentage	2.59%	1.03%	0.30%
Swing	▼1.77pp	▼1.13pp	▼0.02pp
Prime Minister before election
Johannes Virolainen
Centre
Prime Minister after election
Rafael Paasio
SDP

Parliamentary elections were held in Finland on 20 and 21 March 1966. The Social Democratic Party (SDP) overtook the Centre Party as the largest faction in Parliament. Rafael Paasio of the SDP subsequently became Prime Minister and formed a popular front government consisting of the SDP, the Centre Party, the People's Democratic League (SKDL), and the Social Democratic Union of Workers and Smallholders (TPSL) in May 1966.

== Background ==
Prior to the elections, Centre Party Prime Minister Johannes Virolainen had led a centre-right coalition government since September 1964. Meanwhile, Paasio had moved the SDP further to the left in order to attract back voters from the TPSL. Finnish society was undergoing a period of radical criticism of traditional values, such as Christianity, marriage, parents' authority over their children, teachers' authority over their students, patriotism, and civil servants' (including judges') authority over private citizens. The Social Democrats and the SKDL tapped into this discontent at the expense of the centre-right coalition. At the same time, leading Social Democrats, such as former Minister of Social Affairs and Minister of the Interior Väinö Leskinen, had promised to support President Kekkonen's foreign policy with regards to the Soviet Union, and his continuance as President.

== Results ==
Overall, the leftist coalition achieved a combined majority (51.0%) of the votes cast in the election.

Party	Votes	%	Seats	+/–
Social Democratic Party	645,339	27.23	55	+17
Centre Party	503,047	21.23	49	–4
Finnish People's Democratic League	502,374	21.20	41	–6
National Coalition Party	326,928	13.79	26	–6
Liberal People's Party	153,259	6.47	9	–5
Swedish People's Party	134,831	5.69	11	–2
Social Democratic Union of Workers and Smallholders	61,274	2.59	7	+5
Smallholders' Party	24,351	1.03	1	+1
Finnish Christian League	10,646	0.45	0	New
Åland Coalition	7,118	0.30	1	0
Independence Party	513	0.02	0	New
Christian Women of Western Finland	124	0.01	0	New
Christian-minded of Northern Savonia	30	0.00	0	New
Others	51	0.00	0	–
Write-ins	161	0.01	0	–
Total	2,370,046	100.00	200	0
Valid votes	2,370,046	99.64		
Invalid/blank votes	8,537	0.36		
Total votes	2,378,583	100.00		
Registered voters/turnout	2,800,461	84.94		
Source: Tilastokeskus 2004

=== By electoral district ===
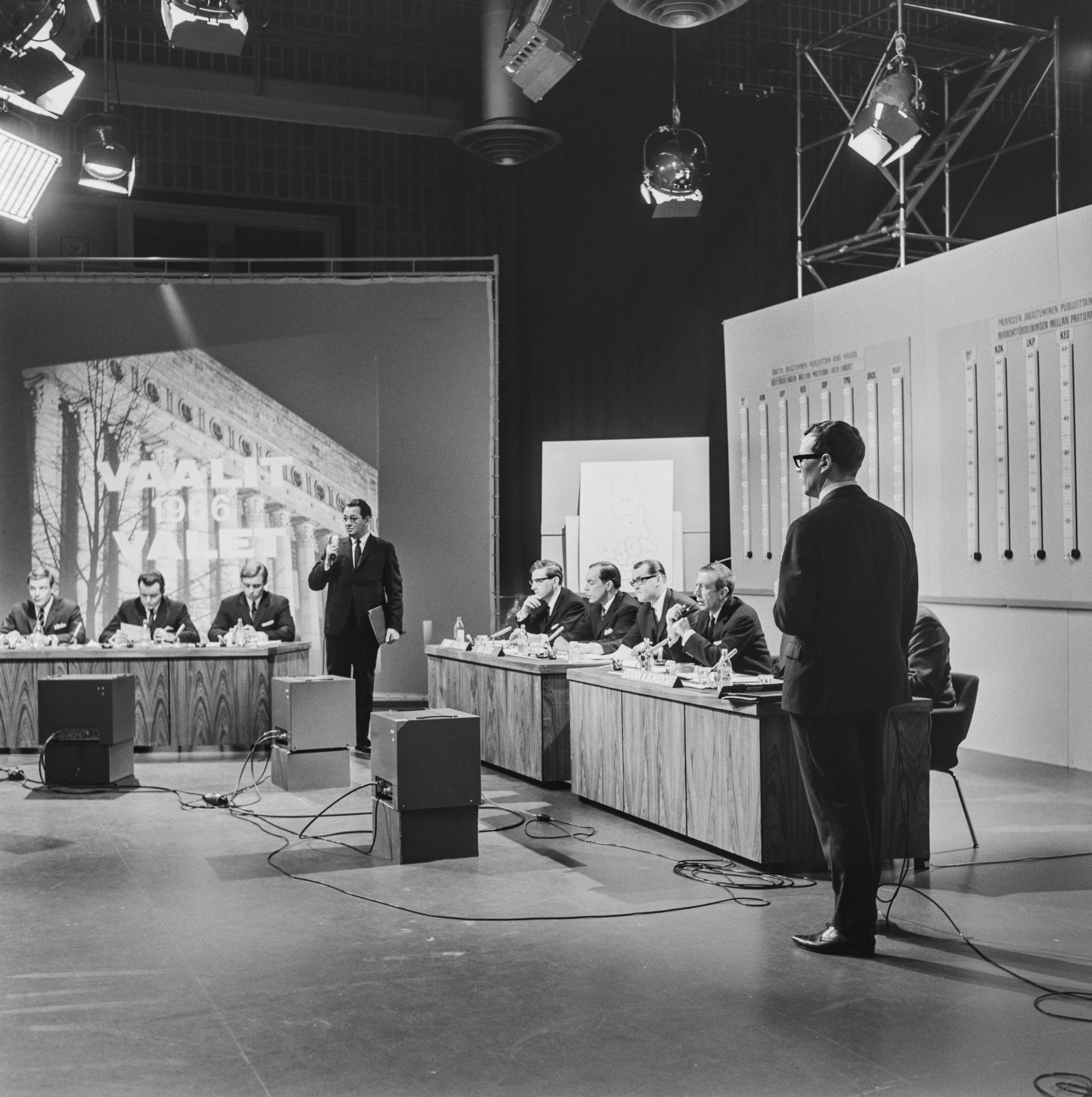
Finland's 1966 parliamentary election results service

Electoral district	Total seats	Seats won								
Electoral district	Total seats	SDP	Kesk	SKDL	Kok	RKP	LKP	TPSL	SPP	ÅS
Åland	1									1
Central Finland	11	4	3	2	1			1		
Häme	14	5	2	2	3		1	1		
Helsinki	21	7		4	4	3	2	1		
Kymi	15	6	4	1	2		1	1		
Lapland	10	1	4	4			1			
North Karelia	9	3	4	1	1					
North Savo	12	2	4	4	1				1	
Oulu	18	2	8	6	1		1			
Pirkanmaa	12	4	1	4	3					
Satakunta	13	4	3	3	2		1			
South Savo	10	3	4	1	1			1		
Uusimaa	18	6	2	3	2	3	1	1		
Vaasa	20	3	7	3	3	4				
Varsinais-Suomi	16	5	3	3	2	1	1	1		
Total	200	55	49	41	26	11	9	7	1	1
Source: Statistics Finland
