= 1991 Finnish parliamentary election =

General election

- 17 March 1991

All 200 seats in the Parliament of Finland 101 seats needed for a majority
- Registered: 4,060,778
- Turnout: 68.39% (▼3.69pp)
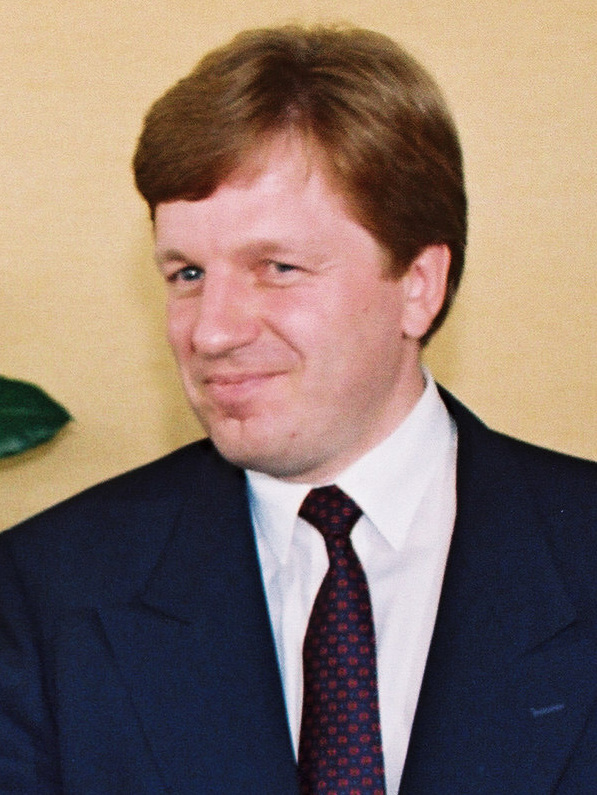

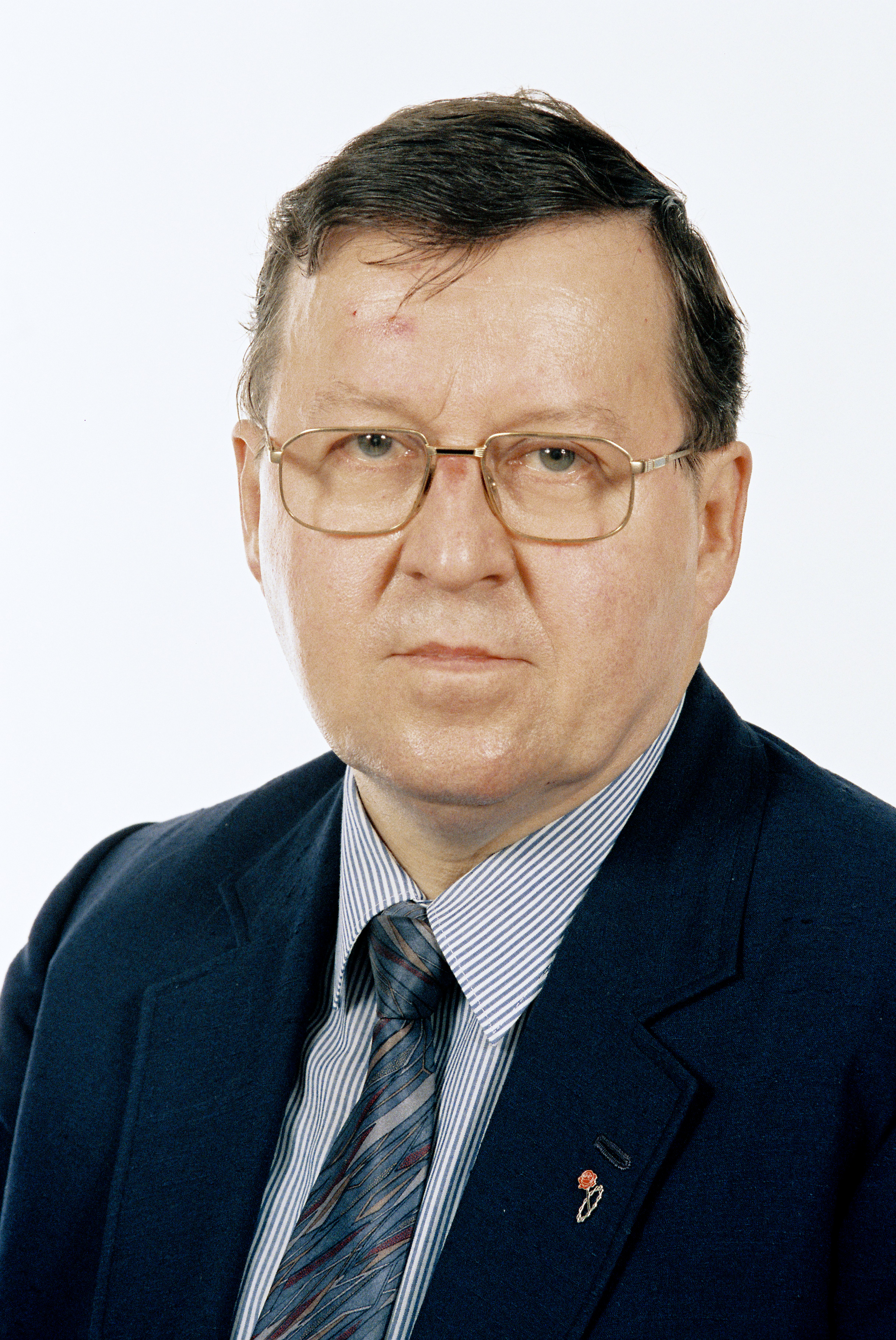

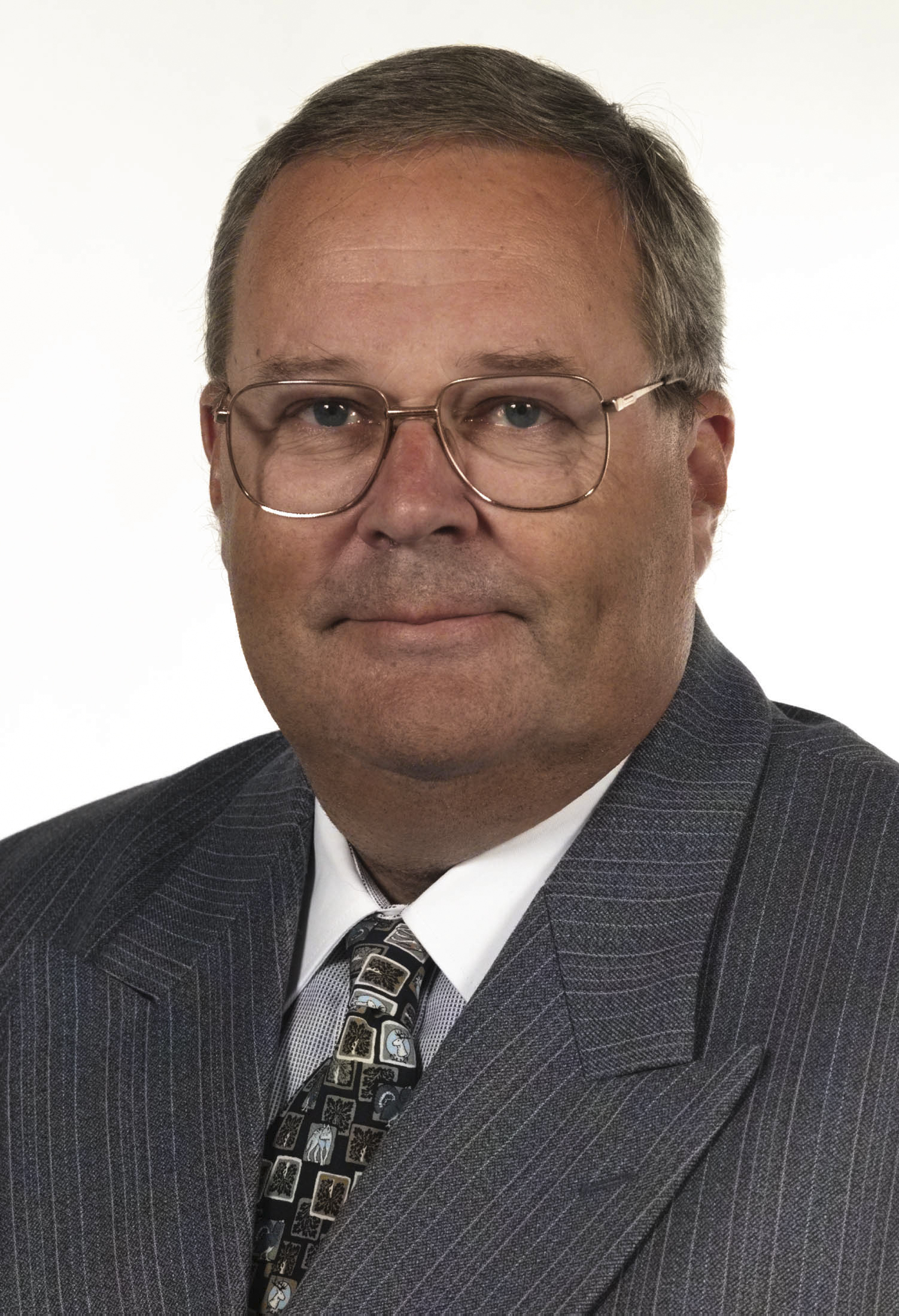

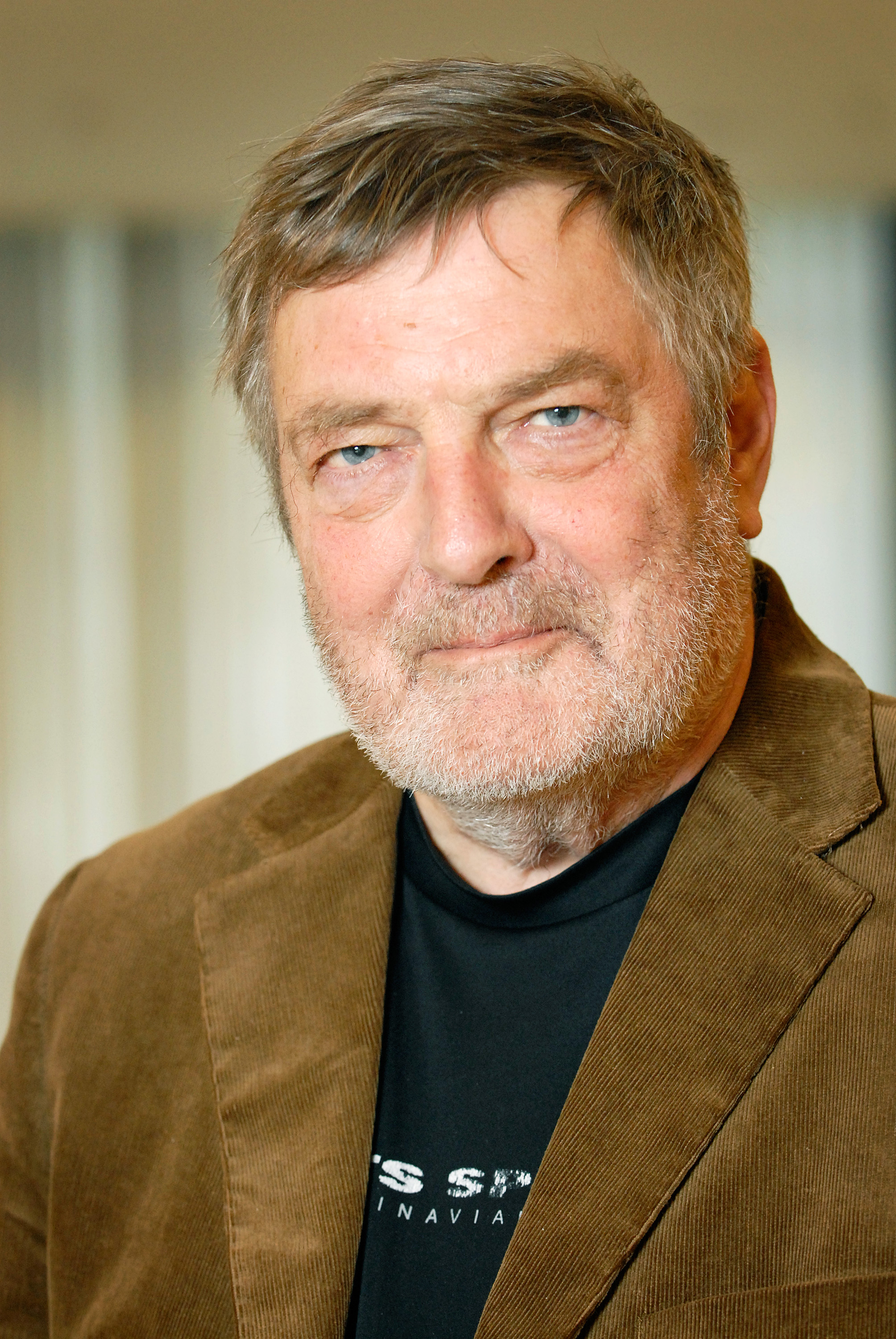

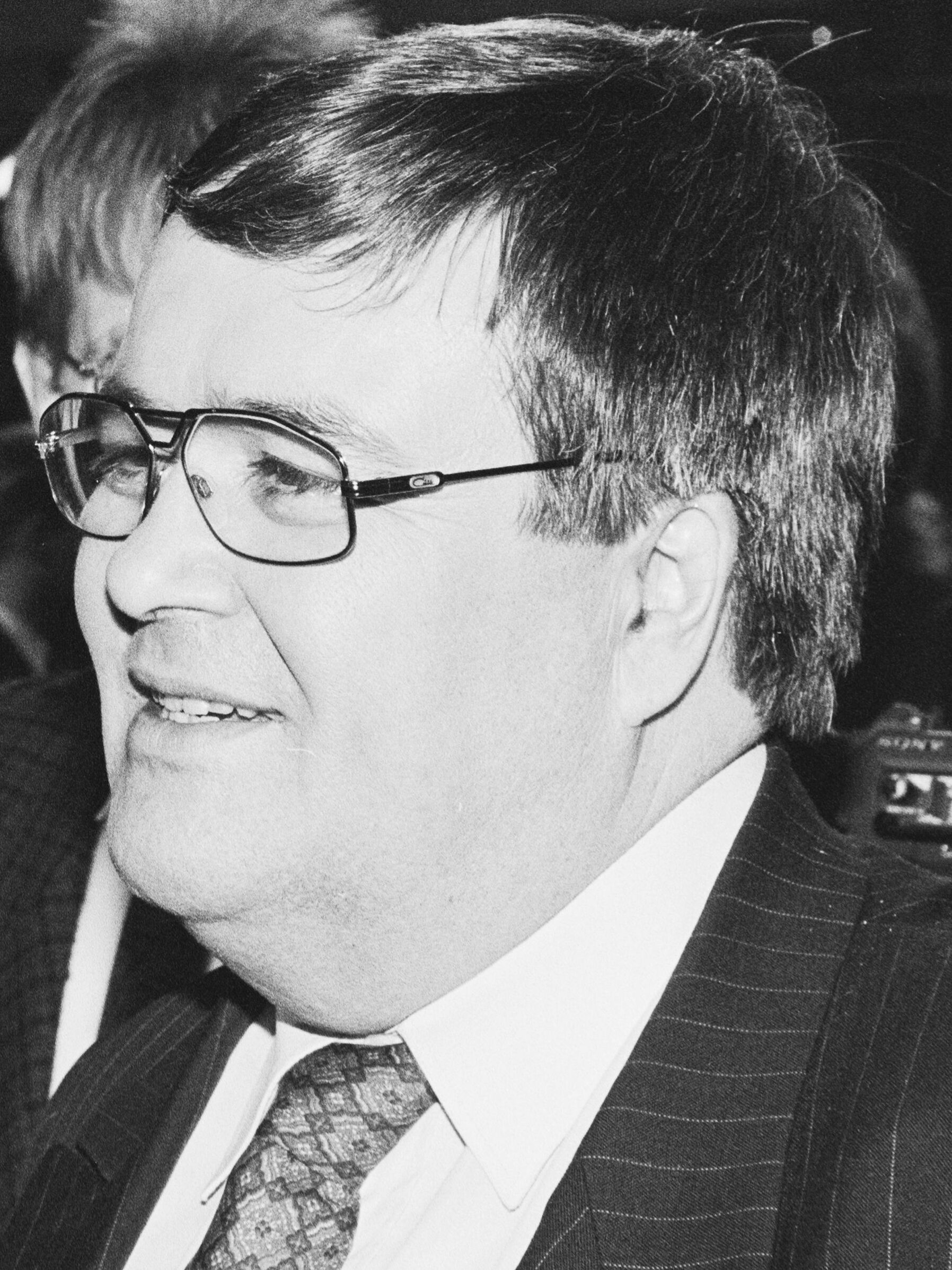

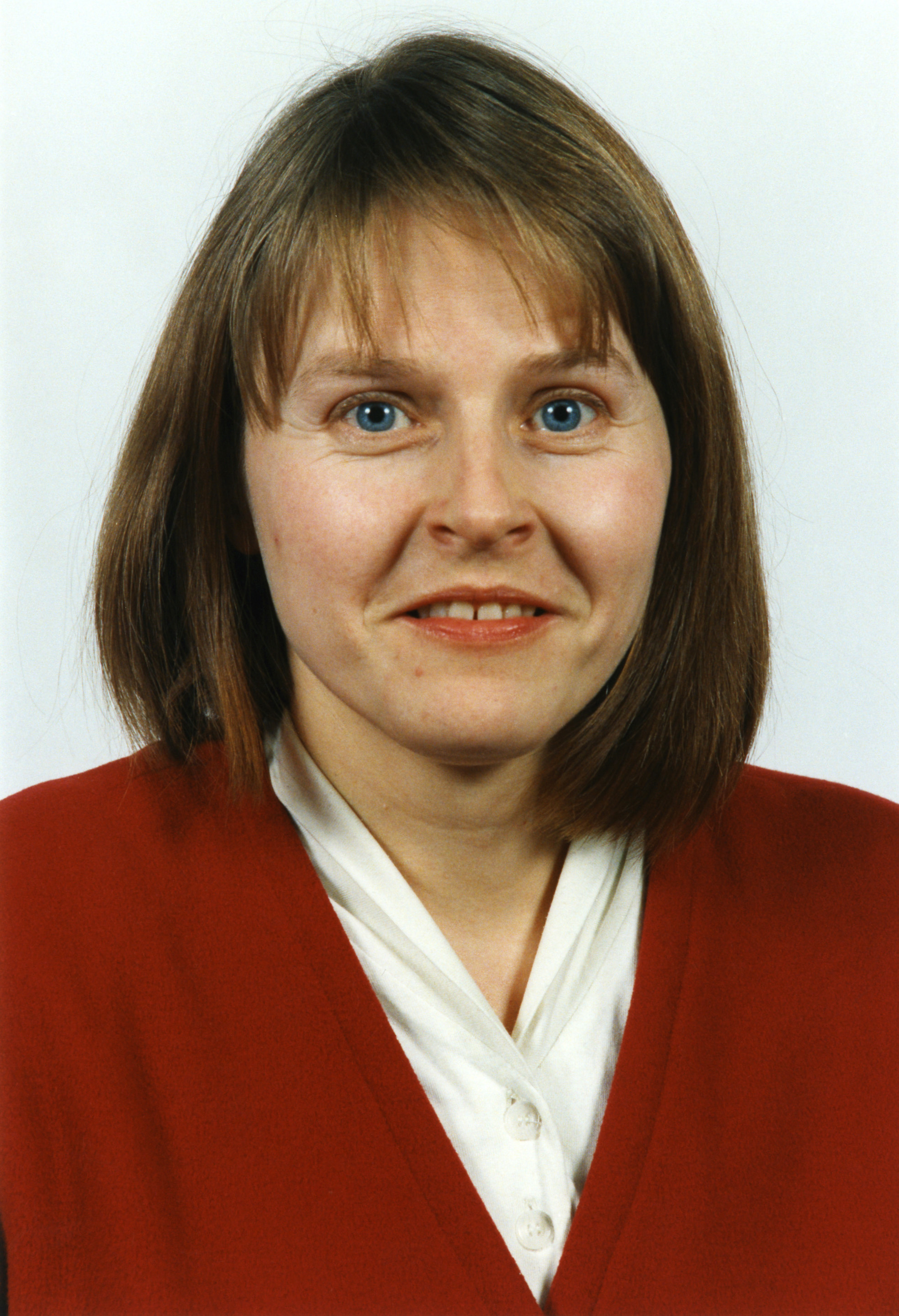

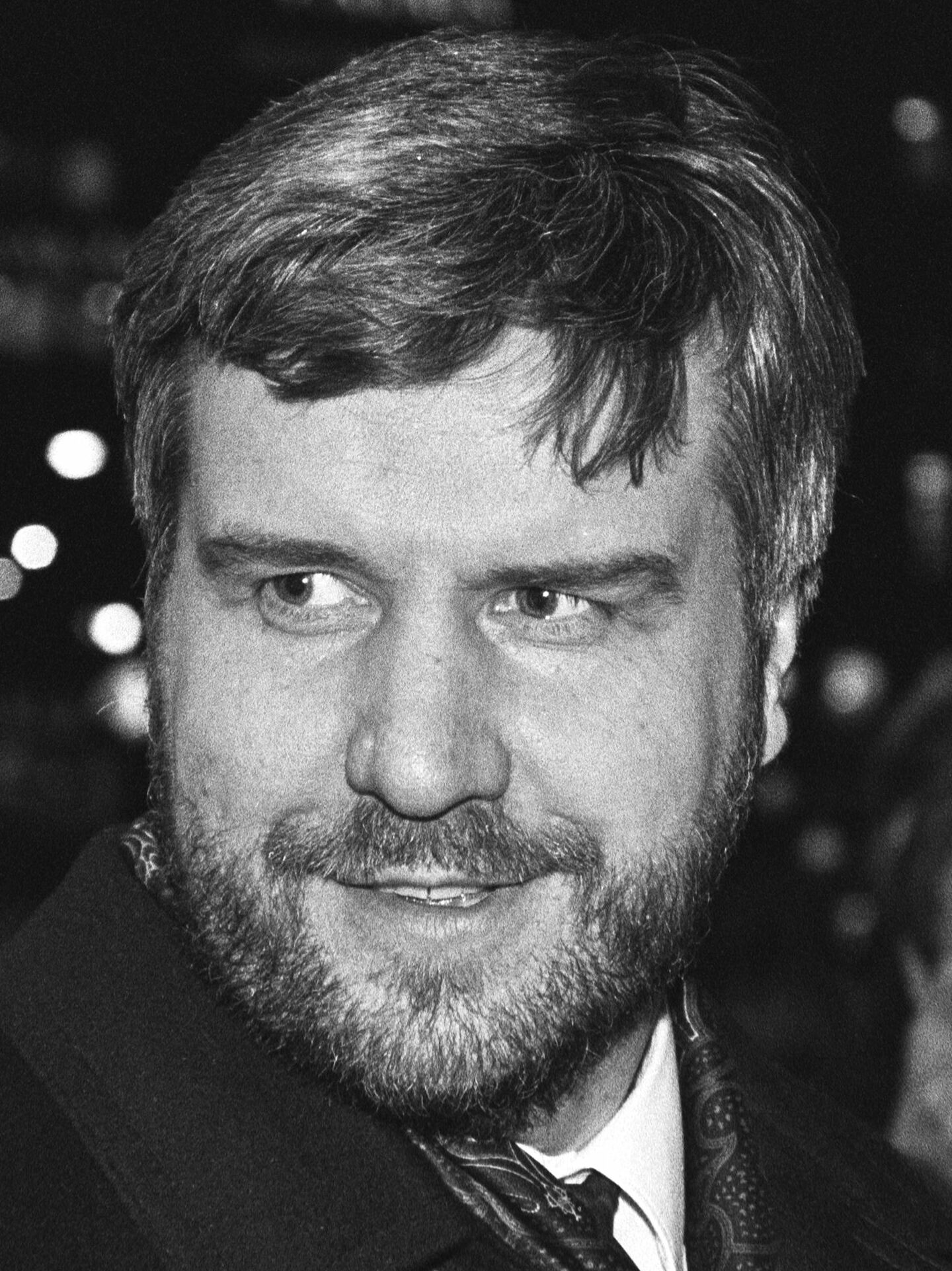

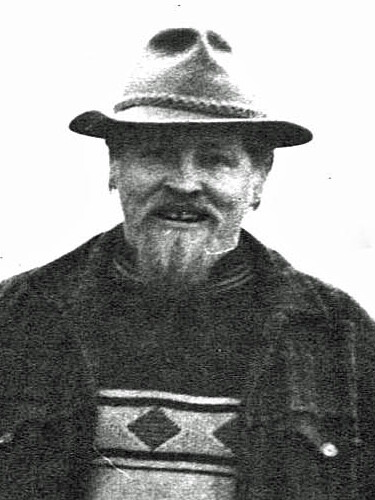
	First party	Second party	Third party
Leader	Esko Aho	Pertti Paasio	Ilkka Suominen
Party	Centre	SDP	National Coalition
Last election	17.62%, 40 seats	24.14%, 56 seats	23.13%, 53 seats
Seats won	55	48	40
Seat change	▲15	▼8	▼13
Popular vote	676,717	603,080	526,487
Percentage	24.83%	22.12%	19.31%
Swing	▲7.21pp	▼2.02pp	▼3.82pp
	Fourth party	Fifth party	Sixth party
Leader	Claes Andersson	Ole Norrback	Heidi Hautala
Party	Left Alliance	RKP	Green
Last election	13.63%, 20 seats	5.30%, 12 seats	4.03%, 4 seats
Seats won	19	11	10
Seat change	▼1	▼1	▲6
Popular vote	274,639	149,476	185,894
Percentage	10.08%	5.48%	6.82%
Swing	▼3.55pp	▲0.18pp	▲2.79pp
	Seventh party	Eighth party	Ninth party
Leader	Toimi Kankaanniemi	Heikki Riihijärvi	Kaarina Koivistoinen
Party	Christian League	Rural Party	Liberal People's
Last election	2.58%, 5 seats	6.32%, 9 seats	0.97%, 0 seats
Seats won	8	7	1
Seat change	▲3	▼2	▲1
Popular vote	83,151	132,133	21,210
Percentage	3.05%	4.85%	0.78%
Swing	▲0.47pp	▼1.47pp	▼0.19pp
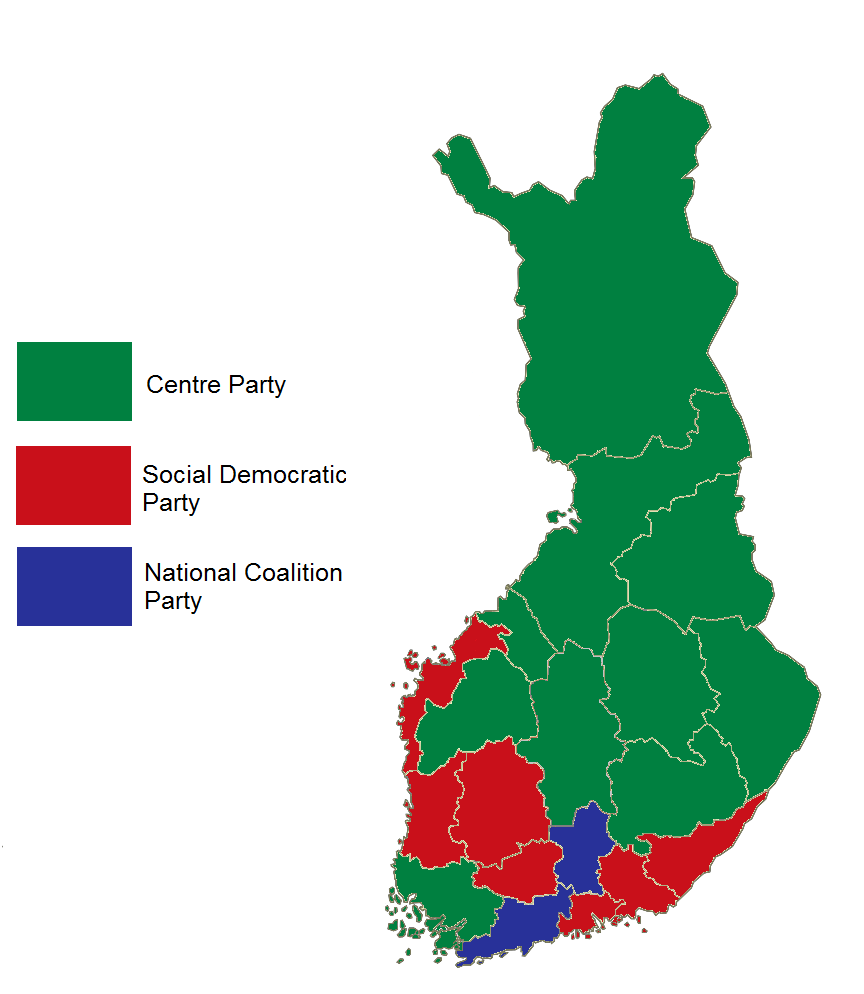
Prime Minister before election
Harri Holkeri
National Coalition
Prime Minister after election
Esko Aho
Centre

Parliamentary elections were held in Finland on 17 March 1991, the first time a Finnish parliamentary election had been held on a single day. For the first time since 1962 the Social Democratic Party was displaced as the largest party in the Eduskunta, with the Centre Party winning 55 seats and forming the first centre-right, non-social democratic government since 1964, with Esko Aho as Prime Minister.

== Results ==
Party	Votes	%	Seats	+/–
Centre Party	676,717	24.83	55	+15
Social Democratic Party	603,080	22.12	48	–8
National Coalition Party	526,487	19.31	40	–13
Left Alliance	274,639	10.08	19	–1
Green League	185,894	6.82	10	+6
Swedish People's Party	149,476	5.48	11	–1
Finnish Rural Party	132,133	4.85	7	–2
Finnish Christian League	83,151	3.05	8	+3
Liberal People's Party	21,210	0.78	1	+1
Women's Party	12,725	0.47	0	New
Pensioners' Party	10,762	0.39	0	0
Constitutional Right Party	7,599	0.28	0	0
Liberals for Åland–Freeminded–Greens	6,546	0.24	1	0
Communist Workers' Party – For Peace and Socialism	6,201	0.23	0	New
Independent Non-aligned Pensioners	5,230	0.19	0	New
Greens	3,835	0.14	0	–
Humanity Party	2,831	0.10	0	New
Joint Responsibility Party of Pensioners and the Greens	2,807	0.10	0	New
Åland Centre	1,858	0.07	0	0
Åland Social Democrats	940	0.03	0	0
Others	11,797	0.43	0	–
Total	2,725,918	100.00	200	0
Valid votes	2,725,918	98.16		
Invalid/blank votes	51,066	1.84		
Total votes	2,776,984	100.00		
Registered voters/turnout	4,060,778	68.39		
Source: Tilastokeskus, ASUB

=== By electoral district ===
Electoral district	Total seats	Seats won									
Electoral district	Total seats	Kesk	SDP	Kok	Vas	RKP	Vihr	SKL	SMP	LKP	L–S–G
Åland	1										1
Central Finland	10	3	3	1	1			1	1		
Häme	13	3	4	4	1		1				
Helsinki	20	1	5	6	2	2	3	1			
Kymi	13	4	5	3			1				
Lapland	8	5	1		2						
North Karelia	7	3	2	1				1			
North Savo	10	5	2	1	1				1		
Oulu	18	9	2	2	3		1			1	
Pirkanmaa	15	2	4	4	2		1	1	1		
Satakunta	12	3	3	2	2			1	1		
South Savo	8	3	3	2							
Uusimaa	30	4	7	8	2	4	3	1	1		
Vaasa	18	6	3	2	1	4		1	1		
Varsinais-Suomi	17	4	4	4	2	1		1	1		
Total	200	55	48	40	19	11	10	8	7	1	1
Source: Statistics Finland

== Aftermath ==
The new center-right coalition government would not have an easy time governing the country. The fall of the Soviet Union caused a collapse in trade with the east, which together with a worldwide recession, caused major economic problems including high unemployment and ballooning budget deficits. In response, the government adopted strict austerity measures, such as cuts in public spending, the unpopularity of which led to the government's defeat in the 1995 elections.
