= Dan-Ola Eckerman =

Finnish footballer (1963-1994)

Personal information
- Date of birth: 26 March 1963
- Place of birth: Turku, Finland
- Date of death: 25 May 1994 (aged 31)
- Place of death: Turku, Finland
- Height: 1.82 m (6 ft 0 in)
- Position: Goalkeeper

Senior career*
| Years | Team | Apps | (Gls) |
| 1983–1991 | Turun Palloseura | 175 | (0) |
| Total | | 175 | (0) |

International career
| 1989 | Finland MNT | 4 | (0) |
- * Club domestic league appearances and goals

Dan-Ola Eckerman (born 26 March 1963 in Turku, died 25 May 1994 in Turku) was a Finnish football goalkeeper.

Eckerman spent his entire career in his hometown club Turun Palloseura. From 1983 to 1991 he played 175 matches in the Premier Division. He also had four international caps in Finland national football team.

== Sources ==
- "TPS legends" page (in Finnish)
