= 2011 Ålandic legislative election =

← 2007	16 October 2011	2015 →
- All 30 seats in the Parliament of Åland; 16 seats needed for a majority
- Turnout: 66.88% (▼0.92pp)
Party	Leader	Vote %	Seats	+/–
Åland Centre	Harry Jansson	23.65	7	−1
Liberals for Åland	Viveka Eriksson	20.27	6	−4
Social Democrats	Camilla Gunell	18.53	6	+3
Moderates	Johan Ehn	13.95	4	+1
Non-aligned Coalition	Gun-Mari Lindholm	12.63	4	0
Future of Åland	Anders Eriksson	9.91	3	+1
This lists parties that won seats. See the complete results below.
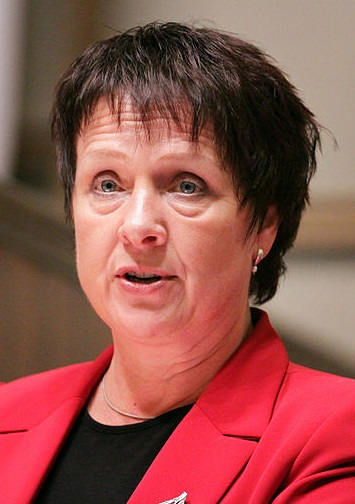

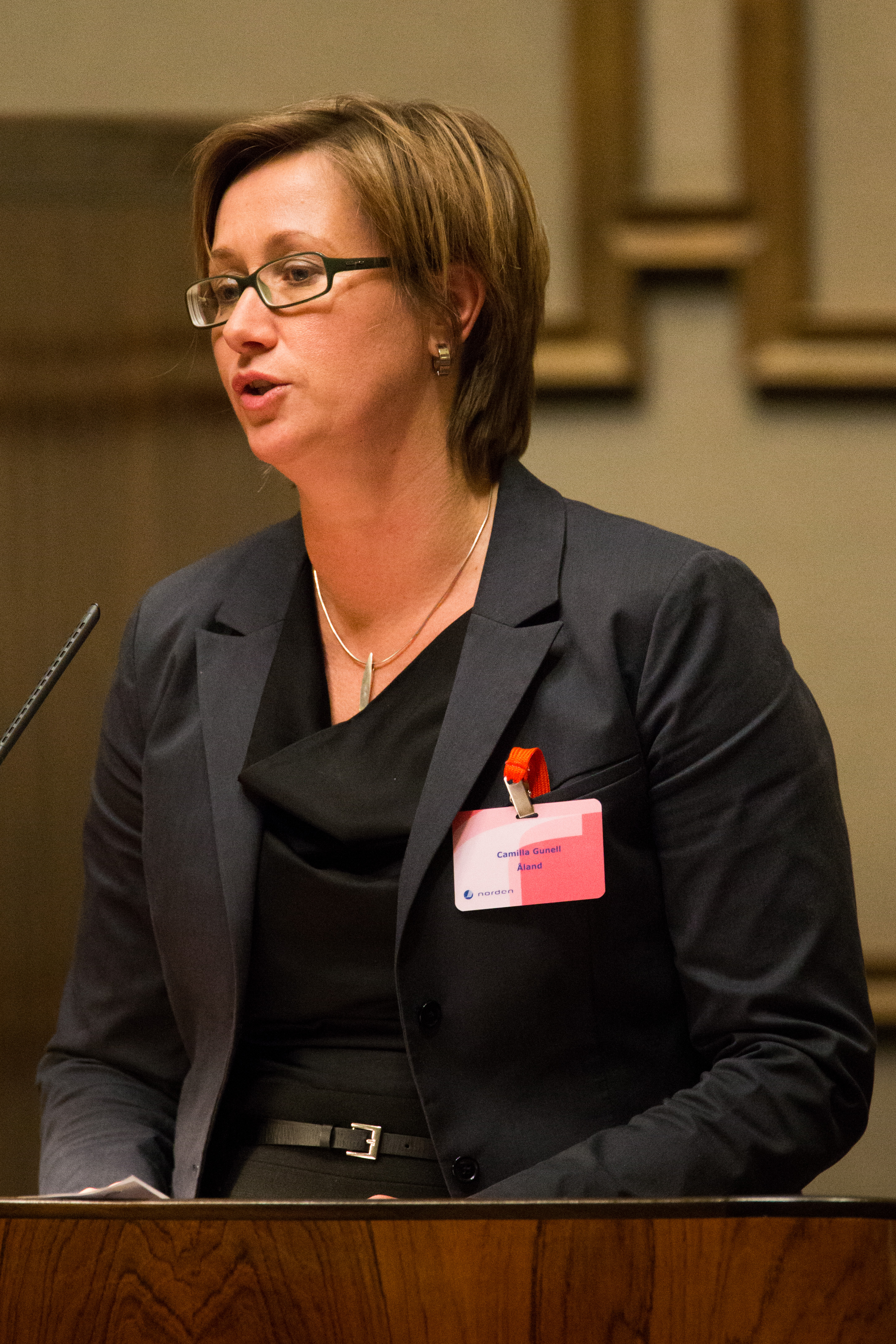
Lantråd before	Lantråd after
Viveka Eriksson; Liberals for Åland	Camilla Gunell; Åland Social Democrats

Legislative elections were held in the Åland Islands on 16 October 2011. All 30 seats were up for election for a four-year term. Members were elected by proportional representation.

== Results ==
Party	Votes	%	Seats	+/–
Åland Centre	3,068	23.65	7	–1
Liberals for Åland	2,630	20.27	6	–4
Åland Social Democrats	2,404	18.53	6	+3
Moderates of Åland	1,810	13.95	4	+1
Non-aligned Coalition	1,639	12.63	4	0
Future of Åland	1,286	9.91	3	+1
Election Association for Henrik Appelqvist	138	1.06	0	New
Total	12,975	100.00	30	0
Valid votes	12,975	97.13		
Invalid/blank votes	383	2.87		
Total votes	13,358	100.00		
Registered voters/turnout	19,973	66.88		
Source: ASUB
