= Lasse Wiklöf =

Finnish Ålandic politician

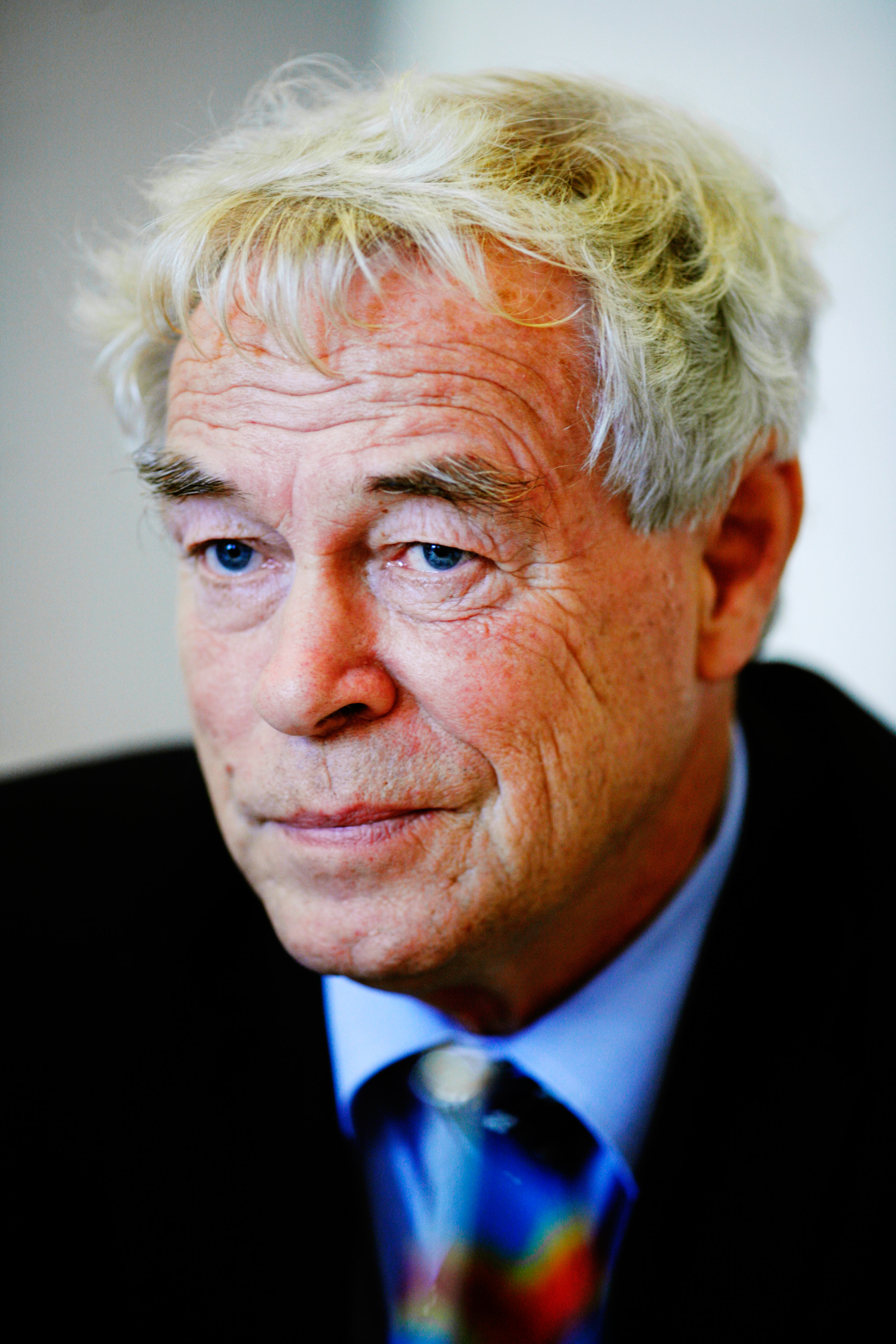
Wiklöf in Copenhagen in 2006

Lars-Åke "Lasse" Wiklöf (21 September 1944 – 23 August 2008) was a politician in the Åland Islands, an autonomous and unilingually Swedish territory of Finland.

- Minister for finance (2005–2007)
- Member of the lagting (Åland parliament) (1995–2004)
- Minister for finance (1991–1995)
- Member of the lagting (1988–1991)
- Minister for finance (1984–1988)
- Member of the lagting (1975–1979, 1 November – 31 December 1983)
