= Ålandic Democracy =

Ålandic Democracy Åländsk Demokrati
- Abbreviation: ÅD
- Chairman: Stephan Toivonen
- Ideology: National conservatism Anti-immigration; Right-wing populism
- Political position: Right-wing
- Lagtinget: 0 / 30

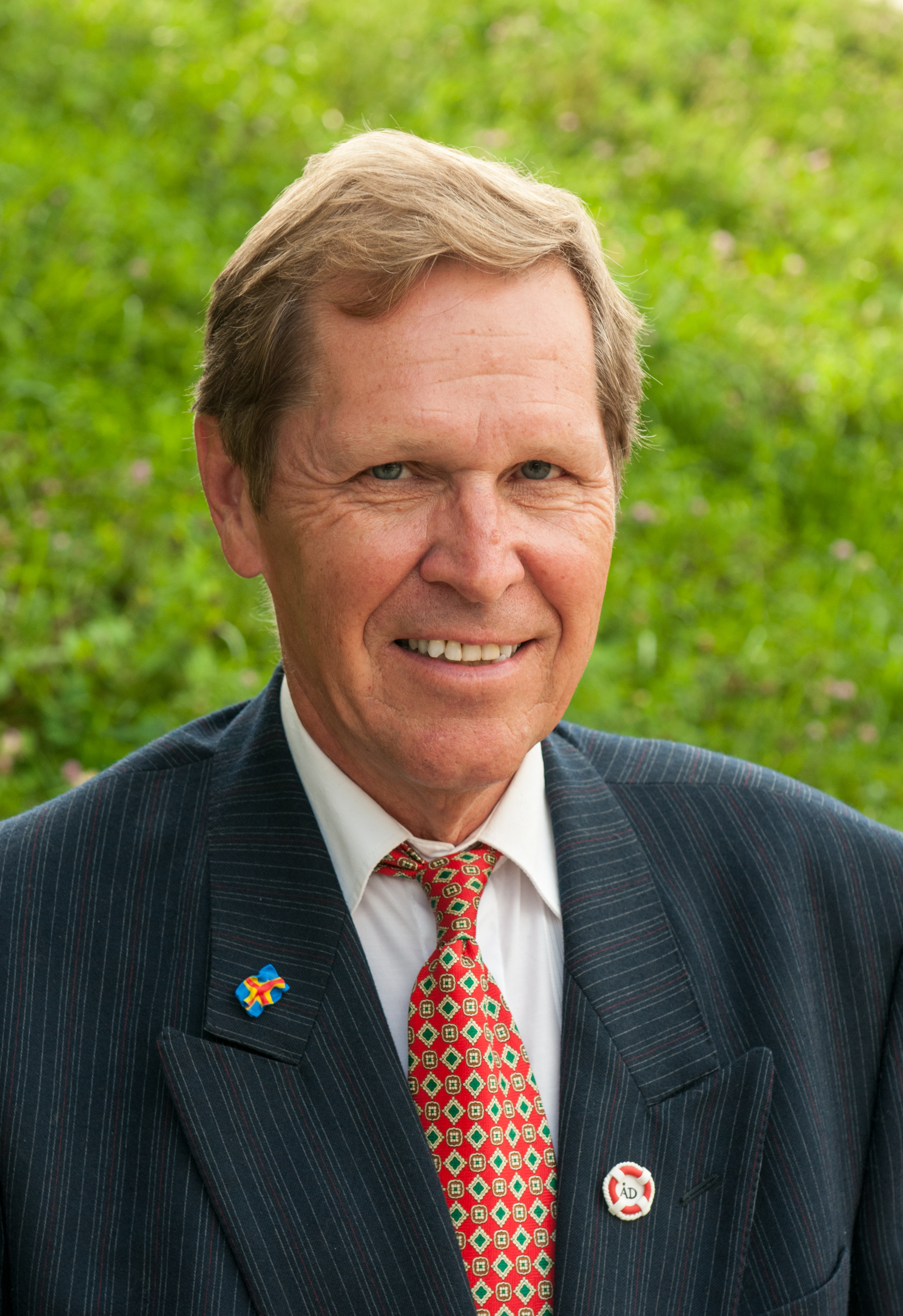
Stephan Toivonen

Ålandic Democracy abbr. ÅD (Swedish: Åländsk Demokrati) is a national-conservative political party in Åland.

== History ==
The party first ran in the 2015 election, receiving 3.6% of the popular vote and winning one seat in Parliament. In the 2019 election, the party received 3% of the popular vote and retained its only seat. The current party leader is Stephan Toivonen.

== Election results ==
=== Parliament of Åland ===
| Election | Votes | % | Seats | +/– | Status |
|---|---|---|---|---|---|
| 2015 | 502 | 3.63 | 1 / 30 | New | Opposition |
| 2019 | 418 | 2.93 | 1 / 30 | Steady | Opposition |
