= Johan Ehn =

Åland Islands politician

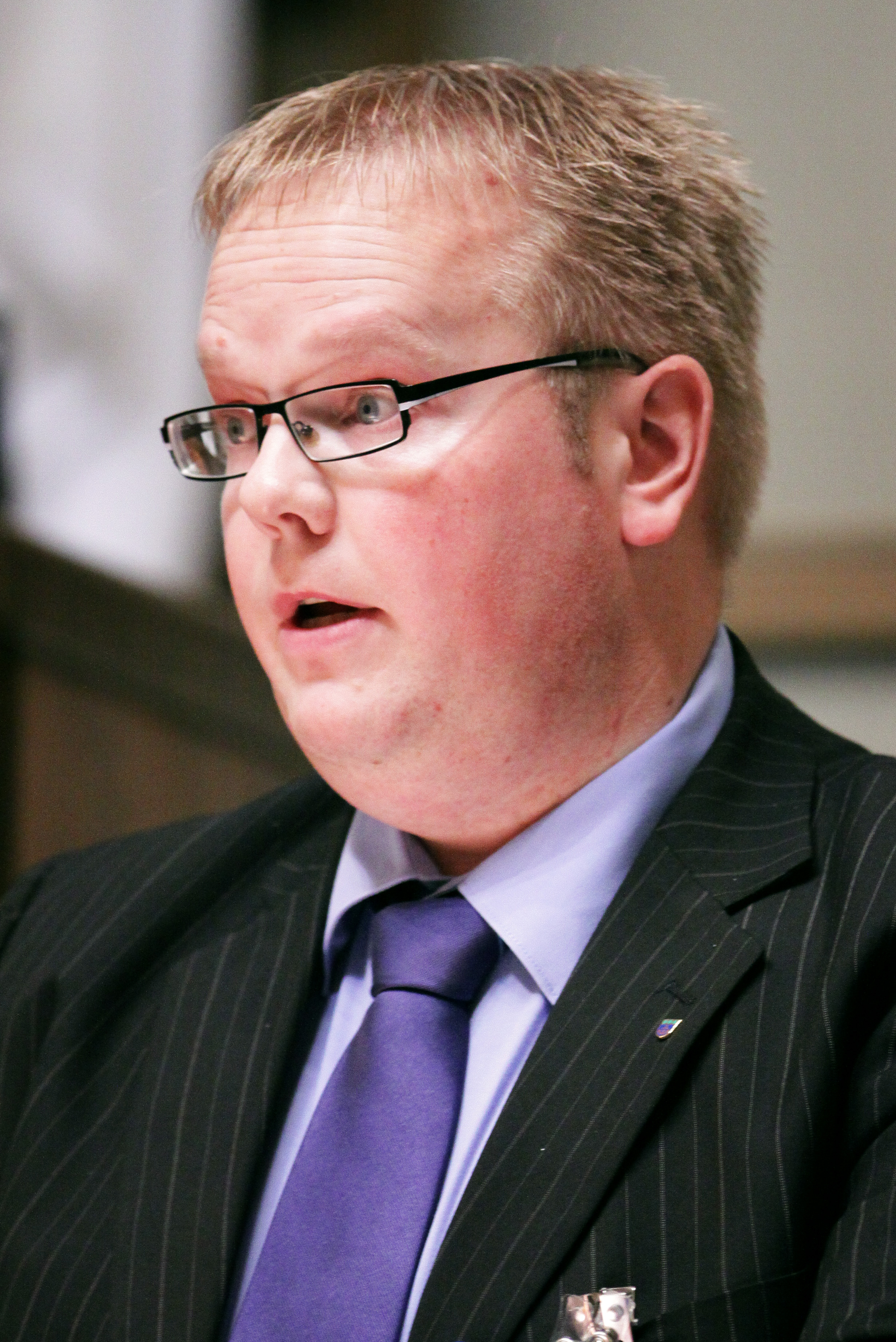

Speaker of the Parliament of Åland
- In office 2015-2017
- Preceded by: Britt Lundberg
- Succeeded by: Gun-Mari Lindholm

Member of Parliament
- In office 2007-2019

Personal details
- Born: 2 July 1975 (age 51)

Johan Ehn (born 2 July 1975) is a politician in Åland. He was a member of Moderates of Åland political party (previously Freeminded Co-operation), and its leader from 2011. In 2013 the party merged with Non-aligned Coalition to become Moderate Coalition for Åland and Ehn as its leader. After the 2015 Ålandic legislative election Johan Ehn became the new Speaker of the Parliament of Åland. From 2011 to 2015 he was in the Government in the position of Minister of Education and Culture.
