= Åland Islands Peace Institute =

Finnish think tank

The Åland Islands Peace Institute in Mariehamn, Finland, conducts projects and research into peace and conflict issues in a broadly defined sense from the vantage-point of Åland and the special status that Åland enjoys under international law. It focuses on autonomy in various forms, -minority-related issues, demilitarisation and conflict management. The Institute was founded in 1992 as an independent charitable foundation.

== Governance & networks ==
The Institute is a member of several national and international networks of organisations working on closely related issues. The Steering Board makes decisions relating to the Institute’s overall remit, while the Research Council is responsible for the Institute’s research activities. The Åland Islands Peace Institute has consultative status with the UN Economic and Social Council, ECOSOC.

== Research ==
The Peace Institute’s researchers and guest researchers focus on three broad subject areas:

- Security
- Autonomy, including the “Åland Example”
- Minorities

The Institute regularly publishes books and reports in these areas. By arranging seminars and conferences and through a growing -library that is open to the public, the Institute serves as a meeting-point for Åland, the Nordic countries and the Baltic Sea region.

Autonomy and conflict management seminars are arranged with groups from conflict-ridden regions around the world.

== Educational activities ==
The Åland Islands Peace Institute arranges courses and seminar series in Åland and internationally in the following areas:

- Conflict management and non-violence
- Global and regional security
- Democracy and human rights
- Autonomies
- Minorities
- Trafficking prevention

The Institute runs a project called Educating for Peace in Åland’s schools. The aim is to introduce knowledge and experience about conflict management, non-violence, tolerance and school mediation in local schools. The Peace Institute runs this project in collaboration with the Åland Government and the schools.

== Co-operation with neighbouring regions ==
The Åland Islands Peace Institute has built a network of non-governmental organisations in Lithuania, Belarus and the Kaliningrad region (Russia).

This co-operation is based on the experiences gained and methods developed at the Nendre Centre for Women and Children in Vilnius, Lithuania. Nendre was established in 1998 by the Åland Islands Peace Institute and the Devyndarbe Women’s Club. Today the Centre offers social services to single mothers and their children. It provides support to the mothers, day care for small children and afternoon activities for schoolchildren. Nendre has become recognized as one of the leading organisations in the field of gender equality education and promotion in Lithuania.

Since 2005 Nendre has been sharing its experience with organisations in Belarus and Kaliningrad. The goal is to give marginalised groups the strength to manage their problems and take control of their own lives. Project initiatives include training, counselling and -development activities for women and children.

The Åland Islands Peace Institute has also helped to spread the “girls’ group” method in Lithuania. This method, originally developed in the Nordic countries and adapted to local conditions, helps to -strengthen young girls’ self-awareness and prevent trafficking. The method is now also being introduced in Belarus.

== Youth work and the “Youth in Action” EU Programme ==
The Åland Islands Peace Institute participates in international youth work in the following areas:

- European Voluntary Service (EVS). The Institute sends out and receives volunteers.
- Youth exchange programmes.
- Seminars, courses and other activities aimed at promoting dialogue and know-ledge about the living conditions of other people.

== The Åland Conciliation Office ==
The Åland Conciliation Office is run by the Åland Islands Peace Institute on behalf of the County Administration in Åland. The Conciliation Office offers conciliation in accordance with the Finnish Act on Conciliation in Criminal and Certain Civil Cases.

Conciliation is a free service. The idea is that the parties through meetings and discussions should be able to agree on an indemnification, e.g. monetary compensation or a work performance. A conciliation session brings together the parties to the breach or dispute and two voluntary, trained and impartial mediators.

== The Åland Islands ==
Åland consists of around 6,500 islands, of which 80 are inhabited, and has a population of about 27,000 people. Åland is a self-governing, demilitarised and Swedish-speaking region of Finland. Demilitarisation means that no troops may be stationed in Åland and that no fortifications may be built in the territory. Åland is also neutralised, which means that it must be kept outside the theatre of war in case of conflict. The international regime governing Åland is based on an 1856 demilitarisation convention.

== Publications ==
- Åkermark, Sia Spiliopoulou Human Rights of Minority Women – a Manual of International Law, 2000.
- Åkermark, Sia Spiliopoulou (Ed.); International Obligations and National Debates: Minorities around the Baltic Sea, 2006.
- Ahlström, Christer; Demilitarised and Neutralised Territories in Europe, 2004.
- Erikson, Susamnne, Johansson, Lars Ingmar & Sundback, Barbro; Islands of Peace. Åland’s -autonomy, demilitarisation and neutralisation. 2006.
