= 2015 Ålandic legislative election =

2015 election in Åland

← 2011	18 October 2015	2019 →
- All 30 seats in the Parliament of Åland; 16 seats needed for a majority
- Turnout: 70.39% (▲3.51 pp)
Party	Leader	Vote %	Seats	+/–
Liberals for Åland	Katrin Sjögren	23.28	7	+1
Åland Centre	Harry Jansson	21.60	7	0
Moderate Coalition	Johan Ehn	17.88	5	+1
Social Democrats	Camilla Gunell	15.84	5	−1
Non-aligned Coalition	Gun-Mari Lindholm	9.61	3	−1
Future of Åland	Axel Jonsson	7.35	2	−1
Ålandic Democracy	Stefan Toivonen	3.63	1	New
This lists parties that won seats. See the complete results below.
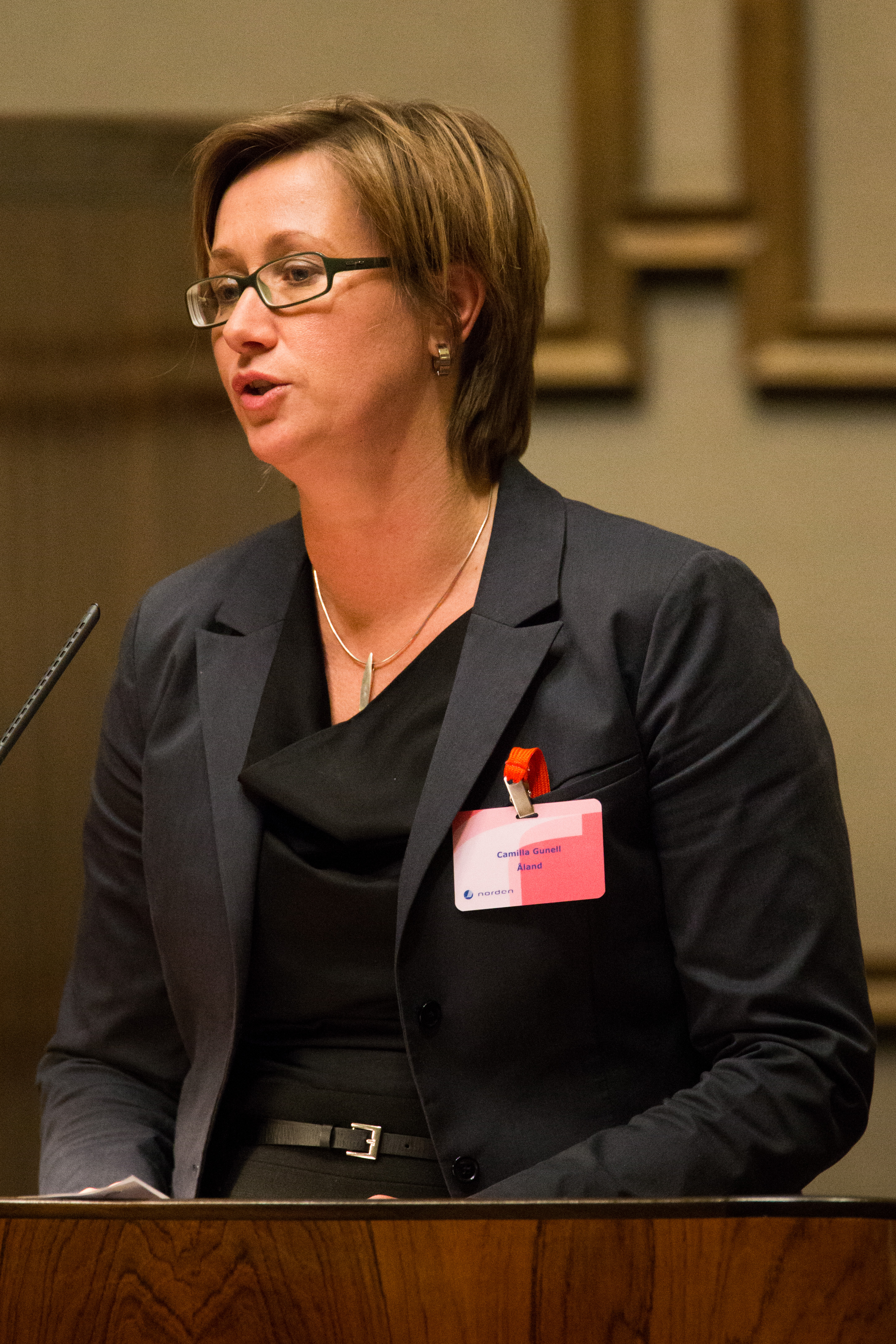

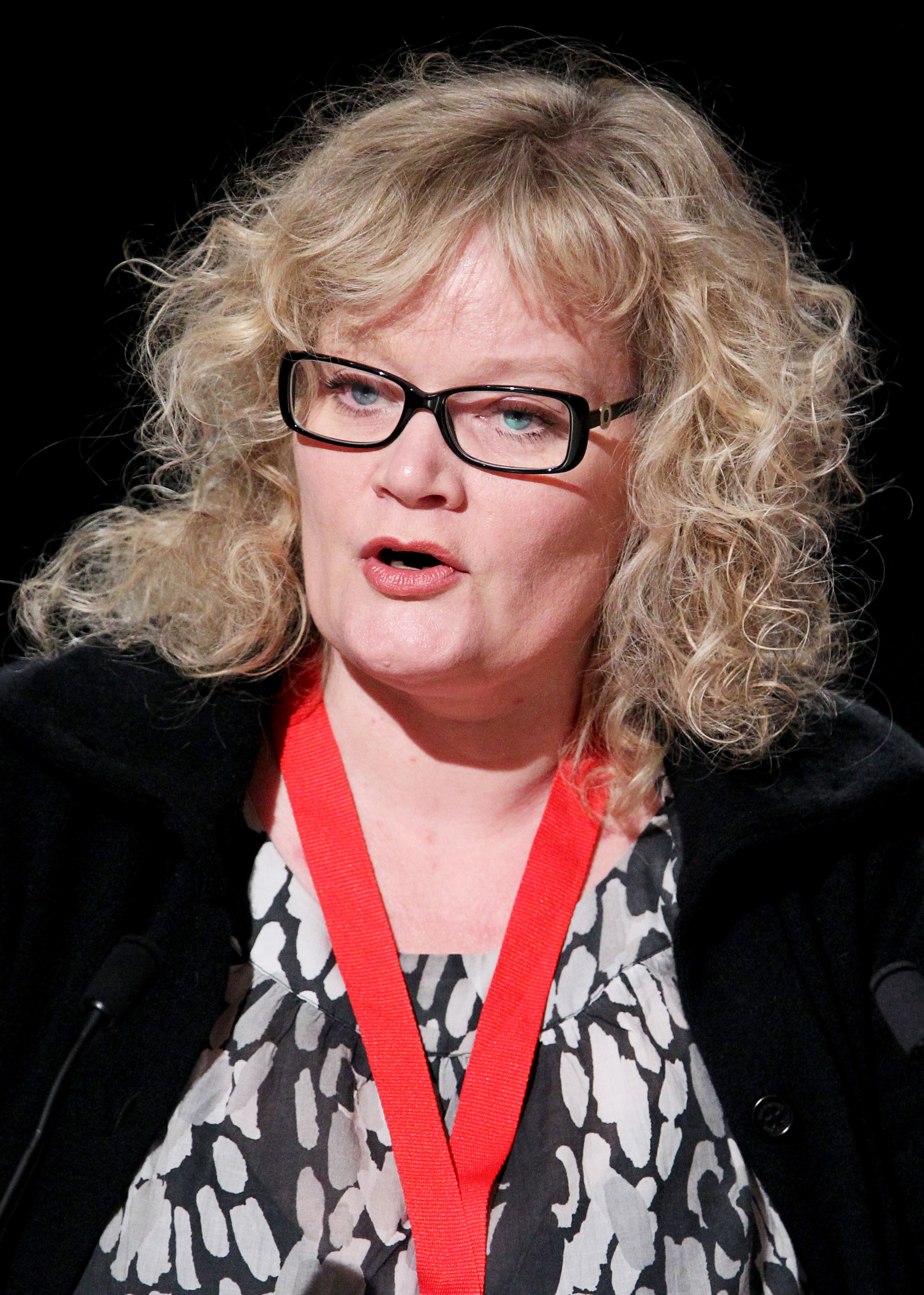
Lantråd before	Lantråd after
Camilla Gunell; Åland Social Democrats	Katrin Sjögren; Liberals for Åland

Legislative elections were held in Åland on 18 October 2015, alongside elections for sixteen municipal councils: Mariehamn town, nine rural socken on the main island, Fasta Åland, and six skerries socken.

== Electoral system ==
The 30 members of the Parliament of Åland were elected by proportional representation, with seats allocated using the d'Hondt method.

== Campaign ==
Seven parties contested the legislative elections, and the municipal elections in most municipalities, although the Liberals for Åland will be the only party to contest all municipalities.

During the 2011–2015 parliamentary term the four MPs from the independent centre-right party Non-aligned Coalition (ObS) merged into the conservative Moderates to become Moderate Coalition for Åland, but the rump of ObS will contest the 2015 elections, and has taken a critical stance against Syrian refugees with a "no to refugees" campaign movie. Another anti-refugee list, the populist Ålandic Democracy, which is led by Stephan Toivonen and also supports equal rights for Finnish speakers, will also be on the ballot.

The regionalist and centrist Åland Centre has called for Åland to establish its own foreign ministry and for the Ålandic healthcare board being appointed solely by the governing coalition rather than the existing system of being proportionally divided between parties.

Other parties contesting the elections were the Åland Social Democrats, the social-liberal centre-right Liberals for Åland, the centrist and separatist Future of Åland.

== Opinion polls ==
Date	Polling agency	ÅC	LÅ	MS	ÅS	ÅF	ObS	ÅD
25 September 2015	Ålandstidningen	7	7	6	4	3	2	1

== Results ==
Party	Votes	%	Seats	+/–
Liberals for Åland	3,216	23.28	7	+1
Åland Centre	2,984	21.60	7	0
Moderate Coalition for Åland	2,470	17.88	5	+1
Åland Social Democrats	2,188	15.84	5	–1
Non-aligned Coalition	1,328	9.61	3	–1
Future of Åland	1,016	7.35	2	–1
Ålandic Democracy	502	3.63	1	New
Sustainable Initiative	111	0.80	0	New
Total	13,815	100.00	30	0
Valid votes	13,815	96.18		
Invalid/blank votes	548	3.82		
Total votes	14,363	100.00		
Registered voters/turnout	20,404	70.39		
Source: ASUB
