= Åland Coalition =

Finnish political alliance

The Åland Coalition (Swedish: Åländsk Samling; ÅS) is a political alliance of the main Åland parties formed to contest the Åland seat in the Parliament of Finland. Its representative usually sits with the Swedish People's Party faction in Parliament.

== History ==
The Coalition first contested national elections in 1948, when they won a single seat in the parliamentary elections. Since then the alliance has retained its seat in every election, polling between 0.2% and 0.4% of the national vote.
