= 2019 Ålandic legislative election =

← 2015	20 October 2019	2023 →
- All 30 seats in the Parliament of Åland; 16 seats needed for a majority
- Turnout: 69.68% (▼0.71 pp)
Party	Leader	Vote %	Seats	+/–
Åland Centre	Veronica Thörnroos	27.84	9	+2
Liberals for Åland	Katrin Sjögren	19.66	6	−1
Moderate Coalition	Annette Holmberg	13.80	4	−1
Non-aligned Coalition	Bert Häggblom	13.57	4	+1
Social Democrats	Camilla Gunell	9.20	3	−2
Sustainable Initiative	Alfons Röblom	8.33	2	+2
Future of Åland	Axel Jonsson	4.67	1	−1
Ålandic Democracy	Stefan Toivonen	2.93	1	0
This lists parties that won seats. See the complete results below.
Winning party by municipality:
Åland Centre: 25–30% 30–35% 35–40% 40–45% 60–65% 65–70% 70–75%
Liberals for Åland: 20–25% 55–60%
Non-aligned Coalition: 25–30%
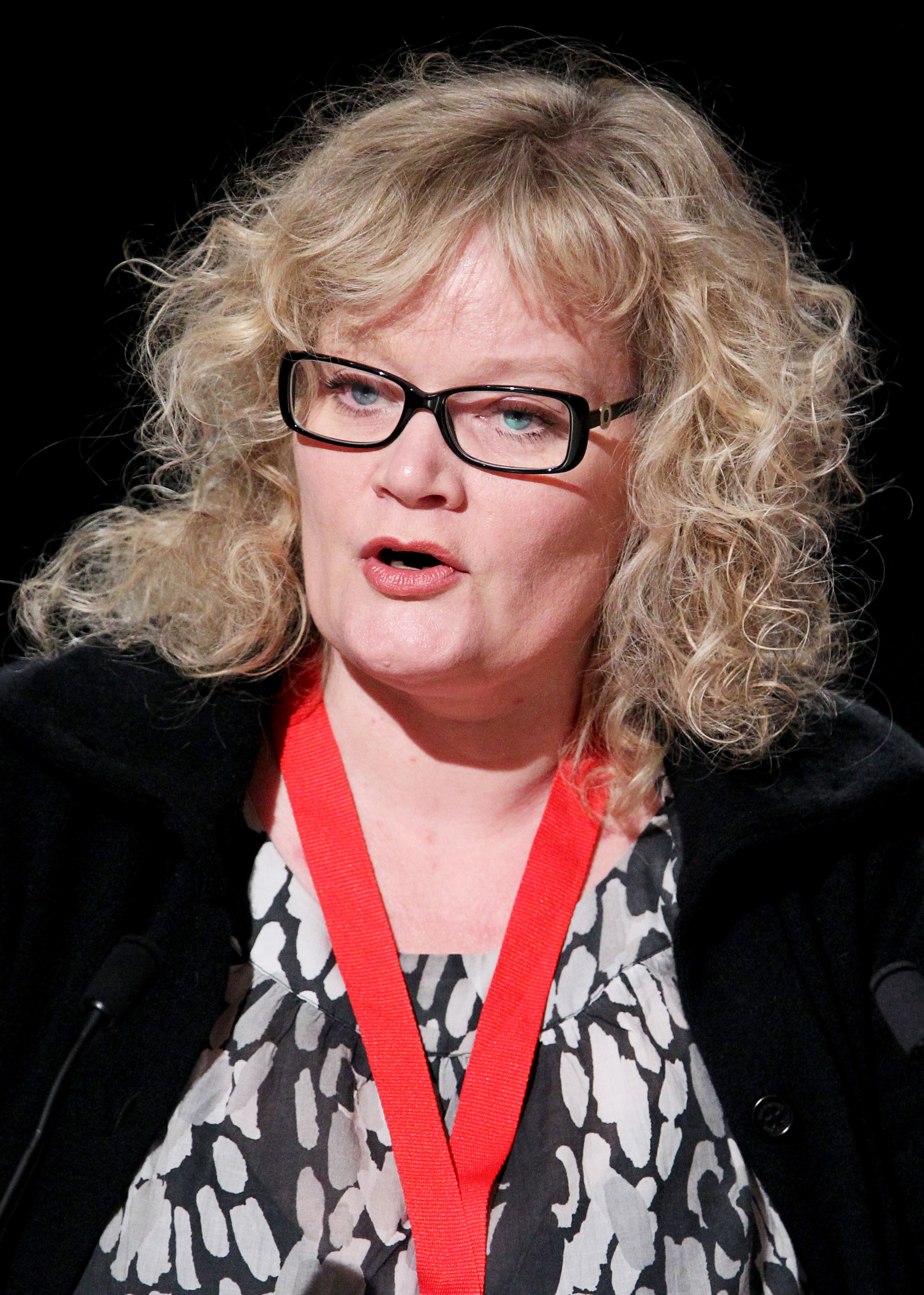

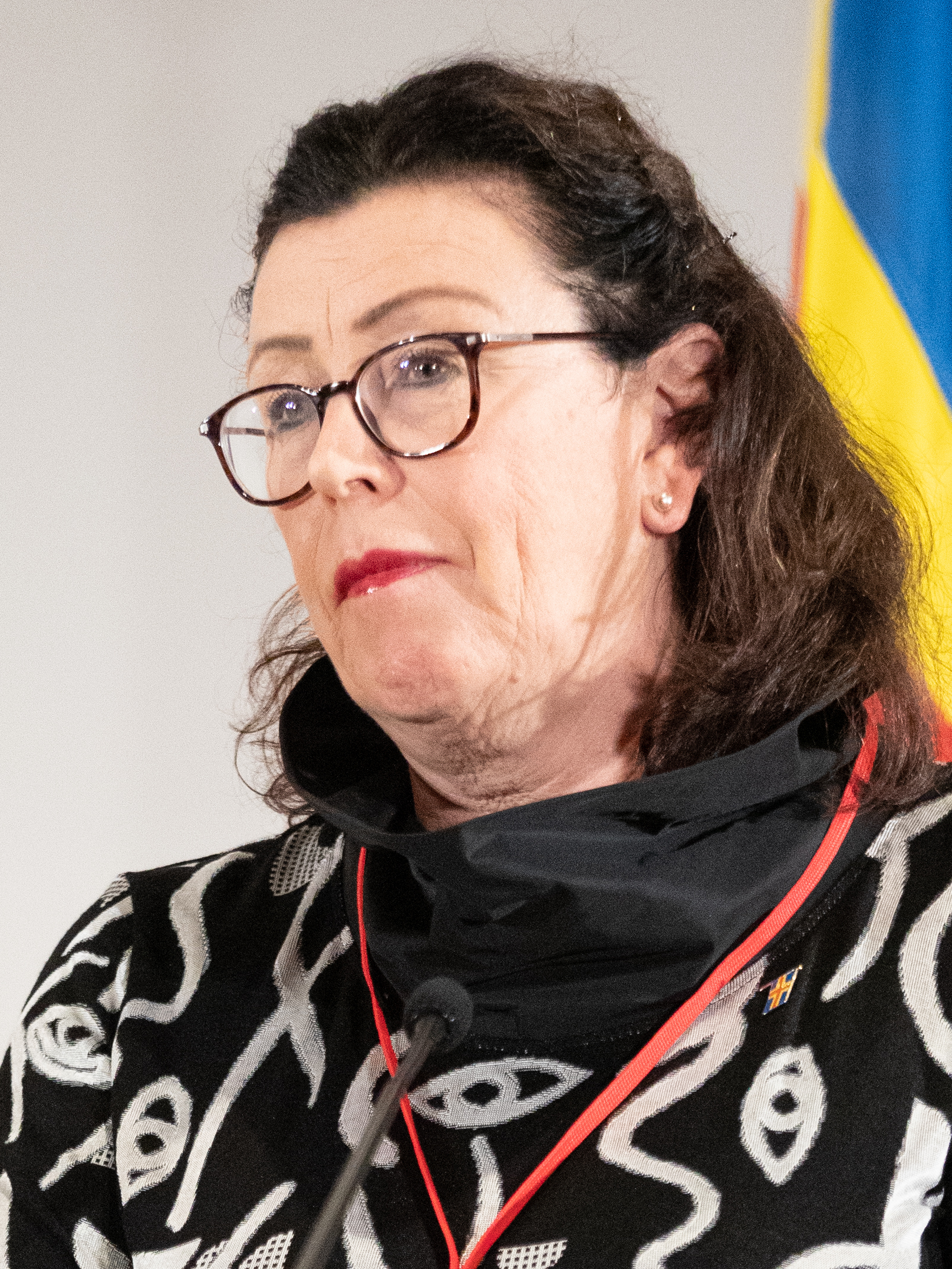
Lantråd before	Lantråd after
Katrin Sjögren; Liberals for Åland	Veronica Thörnroos; Åland Centre

Legislative elections were held in Åland on 20 October 2019, alongside elections for municipal councils.

== Electoral system ==
The 30 members of the Parliament of Åland were elected by proportional representation, with seats allocated using the d'Hondt method.

== Results ==
Party	Votes	%	Seats	+/–
Åland Centre	3,970	27.84	9	+2
Liberals for Åland	2,803	19.66	6	–1
Moderate Coalition for Åland	1,967	13.80	4	–1
Non-aligned Coalition	1,935	13.57	4	+1
Åland Social Democrats	1,312	9.20	3	–2
Sustainable Initiative	1,187	8.33	2	+2
Future of Åland	666	4.67	1	–1
Ålandic Democracy	418	2.93	1	0
Total	14,258	100.00	30	0
Valid votes	14,258	97.69		
Invalid/blank votes	337	2.31		
Total votes	14,595	100.00		
Registered voters/turnout	20,946	69.68		
Source: ASUB
