= Evald Häggblom =

Finnish schoolteacher and politician (1905–1976)

Robert Evald Häggblom (6 December 1905 – 29 August 1976) was a Finnish schoolteacher and politician, born in Vårdö. He was a member of the Parliament of Finland from 1966 until his death in 1976. He belonged to the parliamentary group of the Swedish People's Party of Finland without being a member of any political party.
