= Gun-Mari Lindholm =

Finnish politician

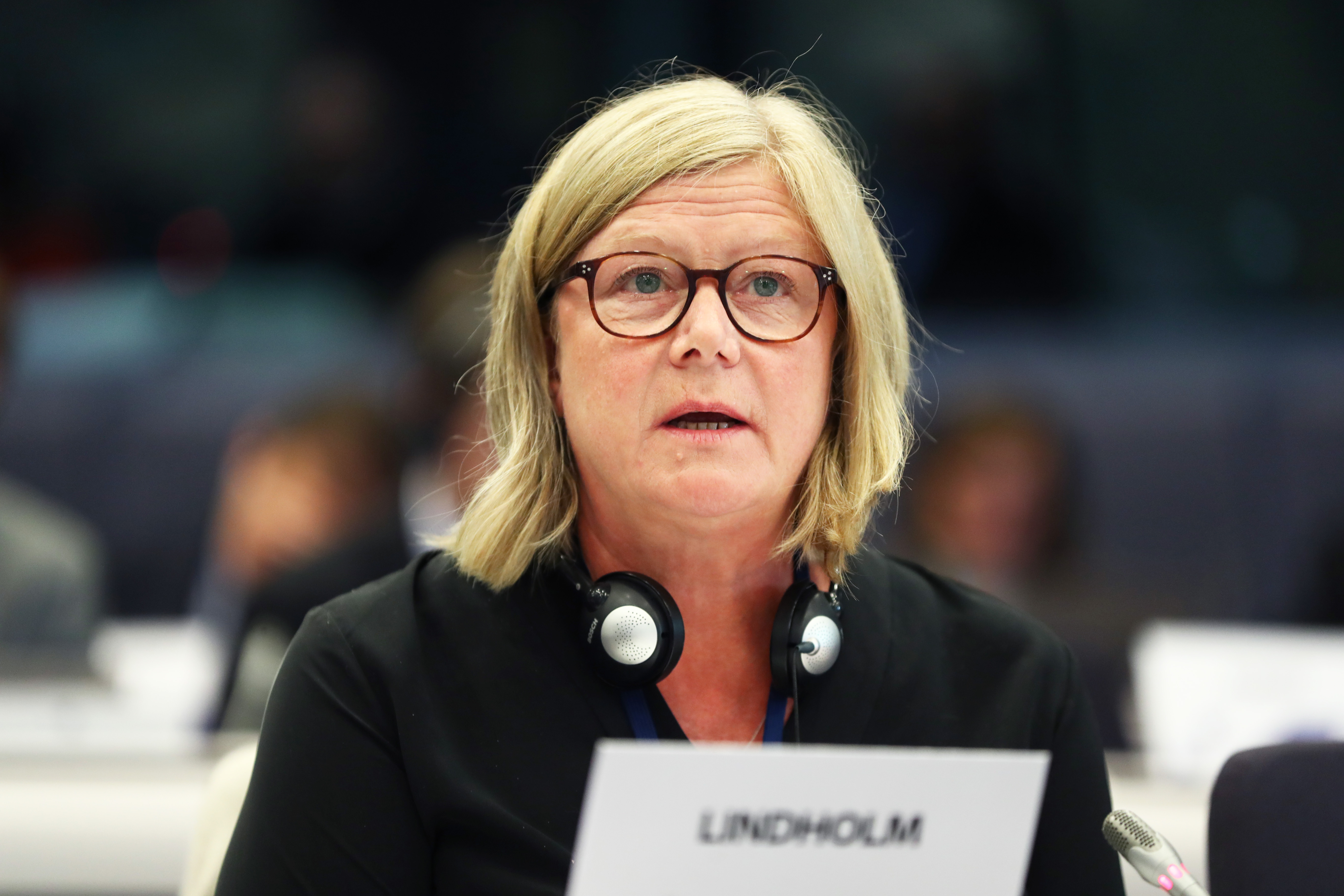
Gun-Mari Lindholm (2019)

Gun-Mari Lindholm (born 29 March 1962) is a politician on the autonomous Åland Islands. She is vice-president of the EUDemocrats - Alliance for a Europe of Democracies.

- Member of the Lagting (Åland parliament) 2005-
- Minister of Social Affairs and Environment 2003–2005
- Chairwoman of the Åland Independent Party since 2001
- Member of the Lagting (Åland parliament) 1999-2003

== See also ==
- Government of Åland
