= Government of Åland =

Executive government of Åland, an autonomous region of Finland

The Government of Åland (Swedish: Ålands landskapsregering) is the executive authority of the autonomous region of Åland in Finland. The government is headed by the lantråd, who serves as Åland’s head of government and is elected by the Parliament of Åland (Lagtinget).

== Heads of government of Åland ==
- Carl Björkman (1922–1938)
- Viktor Strandfält (1938–1955)
- Hugo Johansson (1955–1967)
- Martin Isaksson (1967–1972)
- Alarik Häggblom (1972–1979)
- Folke Woivalin (1979–1988)
- Sune Eriksson (1988–1991)
- Ragnar Erlandsson (1991–1995)
- Roger Jansson (1995–1999)
- Roger Nordlund (1999–2007)
- Viveka Eriksson (2007–2011)
- Camilla Gunell (2011–2015)
- Katrin Sjögren (2015–2019)
- Veronica Thörnroos (2019–2023)
- Katrin Sjögren (2023–present)

== Government (since 2023) ==
Formed by the Liberals for Åland (Lib), the Åland Centre Party (C), and the Åland Social Democrats (S).

- Premier: Katrin Sjögren (Lib)
- Deputy Premier, Minister of Education and Culture: Annika Hambrudd (C)
- Minister of Infrastructure and Climate Change: Camilla Gunell (S)
- Minister of Finance: Mats Perämaa (Lib)
- Minister of Industry and the Environment: Jesper Josefsson (C)
- Minister of Civil Affairs: Ingrid Zetterman (Lib)
- Minister of Social Affairs and Health: Arsim Zekaj (S)

== Government (2019–2023) ==
Formed by the Åland Centre Party (C), the Moderate Coalition for Åland (M), the Non-aligned Coalition (ObS), and the Sustainable Initiative (H).

- Premier: Veronica Thörnroos (C)
- Deputy Premier, Minister of Energy: Harry Jansson (C)
- Minister of Social Affairs and Health: Annette Holmberg-Jansson (M)
- Minister of Infrastructure: Christian Wikström (ObS)
- Minister of Education and Culture: Annika Hambrudd (C)
- Minister of Industry and Trade: Fredrik Karlström (M)
- Minister of Finance:
  - Torbjörn Eliasson (C), 2019-12-10 – 2021-01-13
  - Roger Höglund (C), 2021-01-13 – 2023-12-11
- Minister of Development, Climate, Environment, Energy and Higher Education: Alfons Röblom (H), 2019-12-10 – 2022-10-12

== Government (2015–2019) ==
Formed by the Liberals for Åland (Lib), the Åland Social Democrats (S), and the Moderate Coalition for Åland (M).

- Premier: Katrin Sjögren (Lib)
- Deputy Premier, Minister of Industry, Trade and Environment: Camilla Gunell (S)
- Minister of Finance: Mats Perämaa (Lib)
- Minister of Education and Culture: Tony Asumaa (Lib)
- Minister of Administration and EU Affairs: Nina Fellman (S)
- Minister of Health and Social Affairs: Wille Valve (M)
- Minister of Communications and Infrastructure: Mika Nordberg (M)

== Government (2011–2015) ==
Formed by the Åland Social Democrats (S), the Åland Centre Party (C), the Non-aligned Coalition (ObS), and the Moderate Coalition for Åland (M).

- Premier: Camilla Gunell (S)
- Deputy Premier, Minister of Finance: Roger Nordlund (C)
- Minister of Education and Culture: Johan Ehn (M)
- Minister of Social Affairs and Environment: Carina Aaltonen (S)
- Minister of Administration and EU Affairs: Gun-Mari Lindholm (ObS)
- Minister of Industry and Trade: Fredrik Karlström (ObS)
- Minister of Communications and Infrastructure: Veronica Thörnroos (C)

== Government (2007–2011) ==
Formed by the Liberals for Åland (Lib) and the Åland Centre Party (C).

- Premier: Viveka Eriksson (Lib)
- Deputy Premier, Minister of Education and Culture: Britt Lundberg (C)
- Minister of Finance: Mats Perämaa (Lib)
- Minister of Social Affairs and Environment: Katrin Sjögren (Lib)
- Minister of Administration and EU Affairs: Roger Eriksson (Lib)
- Minister of Industry and Trade: Jan-Erik Mattsson (C)
- Minister of Communications:
  - Runar Karlsson (C), 2007–2009
  - Veronica Thörnroos (C), 2009–2011

== Government (2005–2007) ==
Formed by the Åland Centre Party (C), Åland Conservatives (Fs), and the Åland Social Democrats (S).

- Premier: Roger Nordlund (C)
- Deputy Premier, Minister of Industry and Trade: Jörgen Strand (Fs)
- Minister of Equality and EU Affairs: Britt Lundberg (C)
- Minister of Social Affairs and Environment: Harriet Lindeman (Fs)
- Minister of Education and Culture: Camilla Gunell (S)
- Minister of Finance: Lasse Wiklöf (S)
- Minister of Communications: Runar Karlsson (C)

== Government (2003–2005) ==
Formed by the Åland Centre Party (C), Åland Conservatives (Fs), Liberals for Åland (Lib), and the Non-aligned Coalition (ObS).

- Premier: Roger Nordlund (C)
- Deputy Premier, Minister of Finance: Jörgen Strand (Fs)
- Minister of Social Affairs and Environment: Gun-Mari Lindholm (ObS)
- Minister of Education and Culture: Lars Selander (Lib)
- Minister of Industry and Trade: Kerstin Alm (C)
- Minister of Transportation and Police: Tuula Mattsson (Lib)

== Government (2001–2003) ==
Formed by the Åland Centre Party (C) and Liberals for Åland (Lib).

- Premier: Roger Nordlund (C)
- Deputy Premier, Minister of Finance: Olof Erland (Lib)
- Minister of Social Affairs and Environment: Sune Eriksson (Lib)
- Minister of Education and Culture: Gun Carlson (C)
- Minister of Industry and Trade: Ritva Sarin-Grufberg (Lib)
- Minister of Transportation and Energy: Runar Karlsson (C)

== Government (1999–2001) ==
Formed by the Åland Centre Party (C), Åland Conservatives (Fs), and the Non-aligned Coalition (ObS).

- Premier: Roger Nordlund (C)
- Deputy Premier, Minister of Finance: Olof Salmén (ObS)
- Minister of Social Affairs and Environment: Harriet Lindeman (Fs)
- Minister of Education and Culture: Gun Carlson (C)
- Minister of Industry and Trade: Roger Jansson (Fs)
- Minister of Transportation and Energy: Runar Karlsson (C)
- Minister of Information Technology and Law Affairs: Danne Sundman (ObS)

== See also ==
- Parliament of Åland
- Government of Åland 1999–2003
- Parliament of Finland
- Åland State Provincial Office
- Provinces of Finland
- Ting
