= Government of Åland 1999–2003 =

== 2001-2003 ==
Government members 2001–2003, Åland Centre (c), Åland liberals (lib)

Premier (lantråd):

- Mr. Roger Nordlund (c)

Deputy premier (vice lantråd), minister for finance:

- Mr. Olof Erland (lib)

Minister of social affairs and environment:

- Mr. Sune Eriksson (lib)

Minister of education and culture:

- Mrs. Gun Carlson (c)

Minister of industry and trade:

- Mrs. Ritva Sarin-Grufberg (lib)

Minister of transportation and energy:

- Mr. Runar Karlsson (c)

== 1999-2001 ==
Government members 1999–2001, Åland Centre (c), Åland Conservatives (fs), the independent group (ob):

Premier (lantråd):

- Mr. Roger Nordlund (c)

Deputy premier (vice lantråd), minister for finance:

- Mr. Olof Salmén (ob)

Minister of social affairs and environment:

- Mrs. Harriet Lindeman (fs)

Minister of education and culture:

- Mrs. Gun Carlson (c)

Minister of industry and trade:

- Mr. Roger Jansson (fs)

Minister of transportation and energy:

- Mr. Runar Karlsson (c)

Minister of information technology and law affairs:

- Mr. Danne Sundman (ob)
