= Government of Åland 2003–2007 =

The Åland Islands are governed according to the Act on the Autonomy of Åland and international treaties. These laws guarantee the islands' autonomy from Finland, which has ultimate sovereignty over them, as well as a demilitarized status. The Government of Åland, or Landskapsregering, answers to the Parliament of Åland, or Lagting, in accordance with the principles of parliamentarism.

Government members 2005-2007, Åland Centre (c), Åland Conservatives (fs), Åland social democrats (s):

Premier (lantråd):
- Mr. Roger Nordlund (c)
Deputy premier (vice lantråd), minister of industry and trade:
- Mr. Jörgen Strand (fs)
Minister of equality and EU affairs:
- Mrs. Britt Lundberg (c)
Minister of social affairs and environment:
- Mrs. Harriet Lindeman (fs)
Minister of education and culture:
- Mrs. Camilla Gunell (s)
Minister for finance:
- Mr. Lasse Wiklöf (s)
Minister of communications:
- Mr. Runar Karlsson (c)

Government members 2003-2004, Åland centre (c), Åland conservatives (fs), Åland liberals (lib), the independent group (ob):

Premier (lantråd):
- Mr. Roger Nordlund (c)
Deputy premier (vice lantråd), minister for finance:
- Mr. Jörgen Strand (fs)
Minister of social affairs and environment:
- Mrs. Gun-Mari Lindholm (ob)
Minister of education and culture:
- Mr. Lars Selander (lib)
Minister of industry and trade:
- Mrs. Kerstin Alm (c)
Minister of transportation and police:
- Mrs. Tuula Mattsson (lib)
