= Vice lantråd =

Deputy head of state of the Åland Islands

Vice lantråd is the title of the deputy head of government of the Åland Islands, an autonomous and unilingually Swedish-speaking territory of Finland.

The current vice lantråd is Annika Hambrudd.

List of deputy premiers of the Åland Islands (1988–present):

- May Flodin (1988–1991)
- Harriet Lindeman (1991–1995)
- Roger Nordlund (1995–1999)
- Olof Salmén (1999–2001)
- Olof Erland (2001–2003)
- Jörgen Strand (2003–2007)
- Britt Lundberg (2007–2011)
- Roger Nordlund (2011–2015)
- Camilla Gunell (2015–2019)
- Harry Jansson (2019–2023)
- Annika Hambrudd (2023–present)

== See also ==
- Lantråd
- Government of Åland
- Parliament of Åland
