= 1931 Ålandic legislative election =

← 1928	15 June 1931	1934 →
- All 30 seats in the Parliament of Åland; 16 seats needed for a majority
Lantråd before	Lantråd after
Carl Björkman	Carl Björkman

Parliamentary elections were held in Åland on 15 June 1931 to elect the 30 members of Parliament.

== Electoral system ==
The 30 members of the Parliament of Åland were elected using a party list system. Voters could choose from 61 lists each containing up to three candidates nominated by individual electoral associations. A single candidate could appear on multiple lists. There were 59 candidates in total and no electoral alliances were formed. The first candidate on a chosen list received one full vote, the second received half a vote, and the third received a third of a vote.

== Results ==
Elected candidates	Votes
Julius Sundblom	466.50
Torsten Rothberg	377.50
Johannes Eriksson	209.00
John Isaksson	196.67
Alonso Lindqvist	193.33
Anders Forsberg	188.50
Johannes Emblom	184.00
Anders Viktor Strandfält	179.00
Albert V. N. Jansson	166.83
Paul Påvals	159.50
Karl August Helin	158.83
Elis Olofsson	158.17
Hugo Elfsberg	152.50
Axel Åkerfelt	145.33
Johan Verner Sjöblom	143.50
Erik Eriksson	137.00
Theodor Mattson	135.17
Herman Mattson	134.50
Jac Lundqvist	133.50
Konstantin Pettersson	132.50
Elin Holmberg	131.00
Carl Bengtz	123.00
Fanny Sundström	122.50
Ivar Nordström	119.67
Paul Evert Paulsson	118.33
Karl Husell	118.00
Gösta Nordman	107.67
Walter Sjöblom	106.83
J. A. Sjöblom	106.00
Isidor Broman	101.33

=== Turnout ===
While specific voting data is unavailable for some municipalities, overall voter participation increased in most areas compared to the previous election.
