= 1928 Ålandic legislative election =

← 1925	15 June 1928	1931 →
- All 30 seats in the Parliament of Åland; 16 seats needed for a majority
- Turnout: 16.64%
Lantråd before	Lantråd after
Carl Björkman	Carl Björkman

Parliamentary elections were held in Åland on 15 June 1928 to elect the 30 members of Parliament.

== Electoral system ==
The 30 members of the Parliament of Åland were elected using a party list system. Voters could choose from 43 lists each containing up to three candidates nominated by individual electoral associations. A single candidate could appear on multiple lists. There were 42 candidates in total and no electoral alliances were formed. The first candidate on a chosen list received one full vote, the second received half a vote, and the third received a third of a vote.

== Results ==
Elected candidates	Votes
Julius Sundblom	397.33
Torsten Rothberg	230.00
Johannes Holmberg	201.00
Erik Eriksson	171.00
Axel Åkerfelt	161.67
Anders Viktor Astrandfält	161.00
O. Robert Rosenblad	142.50
Fanny Sundström	138.00
Walter Sjöblom	137.00
Jean Törnroos	129.67
E. N. Carlsson	127.50
Karl Johan Blomroos	120.50
Herman Nordberg	119.00
O. N. Lifvendahl	117.00
K. A. Mansén	90.00
Karl August Karlsson	86.33
Matts August Jansson	85.50
Hugo Hagmark	83.50
Karl Manner	81.67
Erik Alexandersson	80.00
Herman Matsson	79.00
August Nordlund	79.00
Johannes Eriksson	73.00
Erik Nordblom	72.00
Gösta Söderlund	71.00
Carl Karlsson	71.00
Hugo Elfsberg	70.50
Karl Nordlund	70.00
J. E. Nordström	61.00
Anders Forsberg	59.50
Non-elected candidates	Votes
Lars Julius Holmström	58.00
Elis Olofsson	53.00
Artur Lundberg	52.00
Julius Karlsson	50.50
I. Broman	50.00
Paul E. Paulsson	46.00
Hjalmar Holmqvist	41.00
A. Th. Karlsson	35.83
Karl E. Andersson	27.50
Carl Bengtz	27.33
Karl Gideon Karlsson	24.00
Aron Holmberg	23.00

=== Turnout ===
	Votes	%
Valid votes	?	?
Invalid votes	?	?
Total votes	2,510	100.00
Registered voters/turnout	15,087	16.64

There are conflicting reports regarding voter turnout and the number of registered voters, with Vasabladet reporting that 2,440 individuals voted out of 15,112 eligible voters.
