= Kaj Himberg =

Finnish polymath (1844–1927)

- Born: 24 October 1844; Finström, Åland, Grand Duchy of Finland, Russian Empire
- Died: 18 March 1927 (aged 82); Mariehamn, Åland, Finland
- Education: Imperial Alexander University in Finland (PhB, 1867; PhM, 1872; and Lic., 1877)
- Scientific career
- Fields: Electromechanics; Geology; Oceanography; Paleontology; Physical chemistry; Telecommunications
- Workplaces: Helsinki Polytechnical Institute
- Thesis: Om termodynamikens lagar för ett kemiskt system innehållande etrar (On the laws of thermodynamics for a chemical system containing ethers) (1877)

Kaj Emanuel Himberg (24 October 1844 – 18 March 1927) was a Finland-Swedish polymath who was active as a inventor, engineer, physical chemist, geologist, paleontologist, and oceanographer.

== Biography ==
=== Early life and education ===
Himberg was born in Finström, Åland, on 24 October 1844 in the Grand Duchy of Finland under the Russian Empire. He would move to Sund with his parents at 8 years old, although moved back to Finström after the Battle of Bomarsund in 1854. After moving to Helsinki at 18 years old, Himberg attended the Imperial Alexander University in Finland (now University of Helsinki) in 1862, graduating in 1867 with a Bachelor of Philosophy, Master of Philosophy in 1872, and Licentiate of Philosophy in 1877. Himberg's thesis "On the laws of thermodynamics for a chemical system containing ethers" he investigated the chemical thermodynamics of ethers.

=== Scientific career ===
In 1877 Himberg became a professor of thermodynamics at the Helsinki Polytechnical Institute (today part of Aalto University), where he would spend his time primarily studying electromechanics and electrical engineering, but also geology and taxonomy, while teaching thermodynamics. He also became a member of the Finnish Society of Sciences and Letters.

In 1880 Himberg had moved to Mariehamn, which had begun to grow significantly, but would make regular trips to the Helsinki Polytechnical Institute.

=== Commercial career ===
In 1877, Himberg was hired by the The Great Northern Telegraph Company to help design the first telegraph cable on the Åland Islands, which would connect Mariehamn to Nystad. In 1892, Himberg would install the first telephone in Mariehamn, charging an annual rate of 15 to 30 Finnish markka. And in 1906, Himberg assisted the Russian military in building a telegraph station on Prästö island.

=== Later life and death ===
In the 1907 Finnish parliamentary election, Himberg voted for Swedish People's Party of Finland over the language strife and would vote for them for the rest of his life. After Finland gained independence in 1917 and the Åland Islands dispute, Himberg would vote for the Independent Ålanders' Electoral Alliance in the 1922 Ålandic legislative election, as Himberg supported the idea of Åland staying integrated with Finland rather than Sweden, but he did not vote in the 1925 election. Himberg passed away on 18 March, 1927 at the age of 82, in Mariehamn, Åland. Himberg's estate sold a majority of his papers and collections to a private collector in 1930.

== Science and inventions ==
=== Electromechanics ===
In 1875, Himberg built his own six-unit code teleprinter, which was possibly one of the first to use a six-unit code, at least one year prior to when Émile Baudot experimented with a six-bit code which he changed to a five-bit code. Himberg's teleprinter used a nonuniform 6-unit character frame during serial transmission with 64 combinations, but was found to be too clunky and difficult to use, so no more than one was ever made.

In 1895, Himberg built his own two axis stepping switch (device that switches an input signal path to one of several possible output paths) to be used for a telephone exchange to route telephone calls. It used a horizontal shaft that was driven by a gear with a single compact group of wipers that could connect to one of 50 different fixed contacts in ten levels. It had two stepping coils with pawls and ratchets, one to raise the wipers to the desired banks of contacts, one to rotate the wipers into the banks, and the coils were typically driven by the electrical pulses derived from a rotary dial from a telephone. Similarly to the teleprinter, this design didn't catch on but more due to Himberg not getting a patent and it being more of an experiment.

=== Geology and paleontology ===
In Mariehamn, Himberg would spend time mapping strata and dikes in Ytternäs and Västernäs. Himberg also investigated shatter cones in the southwestern part of Lumparn bay, which at the time was only known as a cryptovolcanic structure. In 1890, Himberg mapped bedrock in Brändö, specifically around the circular Ängskärsfjärden, and corresponded with Fredrik Johan Wiik who was the first professor of geology and mineralogy at the Imperial Alexander University. Himberg would conduct petrography on Åva granite from Ängskärsfjärden, which is unique compared to rapakivi granite that is regular across Åland.

Himberg also took an interest to fossils around Lumparn while investigating shatter cones, and in the late 1880s documented the fossils of trilobites and conodonts, with the latter he believed to be a species of annelid rather than jawless fish. He would later in 1901 document trilobites in Ytternäs, Mariehamn, while mapping strata, concluding that Åland was once fully under water.

=== Oceanography ===
In the 1880s, Himberg would also do oceanography of the Archipelago Sea and Sea of Åland to try and optimize and lower the safety risk of the Stockholm–Turku mail route, by measuring sea-level change caused by melting or freezing of ice during the winter and incidentally post-glacial rebound. Despite the increasing use of steamboats in that they could deliver all of the post at once by crossing the Baltic Sea, Himberg continued conducting oceanography due to his interest in the subject. Himberg also reliably measured the deepest point of the Sea of Åland, at a depth of 301 m (988 ft) by using a sounding line.

=== Thermodynamics ===
Between 1877 and 1880 while working full time at Helsinki Polytechnical Institute, Himberg would conduct several high pressure liquid compressibility experiments using piezometers (piezoelectric effect) and heavy-gauge iron tubes to apply massive hydrostatic pressures to various ethers, such as diethyl ether, and ketones, such as acetone.
