= 1937 Ålandic legislative election =

← 1934	15 June 1937	1945 →
- All 30 seats in the Parliament of Åland; 16 seats needed for a majority
- Turnout: 33.00%
Lantråd before	Lantråd after
Carl Björkman	Viktor Strandfält

Parliamentary elections were held in Åland, an autonomous region of Finland, on 15 June 1937 to elect the 30 members of Parliament.

== Electoral system ==
The 30 members of the Parliament of Åland were elected using a proportional party list system. Voters could choose from 49 lists each containing one or two candidates nominated by individual electoral associations. Electoral associations could form alliances with other lists resulting in three individual electoral alliances. A single candidate could appear on multiple lists and alliances. For example, Julius Sundblom appeared on all 29 lists of the Electoral alliance no. 2 (Valförbund N:o 2), on two lists of the Electoral alliance of fishermen, seamen and small farmers (Fiskar-, sjöfolkets och småbrukarfolkets valförbund) and on three additional lists outside of any alliance.

== Results ==
Julius Sundblom's seat is counted towards Electoral alliance no. 2, as he received the majority of his votes from lists associated with that alliance.

Alliance	Votes	%	Seats
Electoral alliance no. 2	2,904	60.12	19
Electoral alliance of fishermen, seamen and small farmers	755	15.63	5
Lists without alliance	816	16.89	4
Electoral alliance no. 1	355	7.35	2
Total	4,830	100.00	30
Valid votes	4,830	99.75	
Invalid/blank votes	12	0.25	
Total votes	4,842	100.00	
Registered voters/turnout	14,673	33.00	
Source: ÅSUB
