= 1945 Ålandic legislative election =

← 1937	15 June 1945	1948 →
- All 30 seats in the Parliament of Åland; 16 seats needed for a majority
Lantråd before	Lantråd after
Viktor Strandfält	Viktor Strandfält

Parliamentary elections were held in Åland on 15 June 1945 to elect the 30 members of Parliament.

== Electoral system ==
The 30 members of the Parliament of Åland were elected using a proportional party list system. Voters could choose from 54 lists each containing one or two candidates. Electoral associations could form alliances with other lists resulting in four individual electoral alliances. A single candidate could appear on multiple lists or alliances. For example, both Ålanders' electoral alliances filled their lists with unique candidates as the first choice, while a general candidate was placed as the second choice. In this case, Julius Sundblom served as the general candidate for Ålanders' electoral alliance no. 1, and Tor Brenning for Ålanders' electoral alliance no. 2.

== Results ==
Alliance	Votes	%	Seats
Ålanders' electoral alliance no. 1	3,822	53.54	17
Ålanders' electoral alliance no. 2	2,099	29.40	9
Workers' electoral alliance of Åland	567	7.94	2
Free electoral alliance	527	7.38	2
Lists without alliance	124	1.74	0
Total	7,139	100.00	30
Valid votes	7,139	99.90	
Invalid/blank votes	7	0.10	
Total votes	7,146	100.00	
Registered voters/turnout		–	
Source: Åland
