= Annette Bergbo =

Ålandic politician and journalist

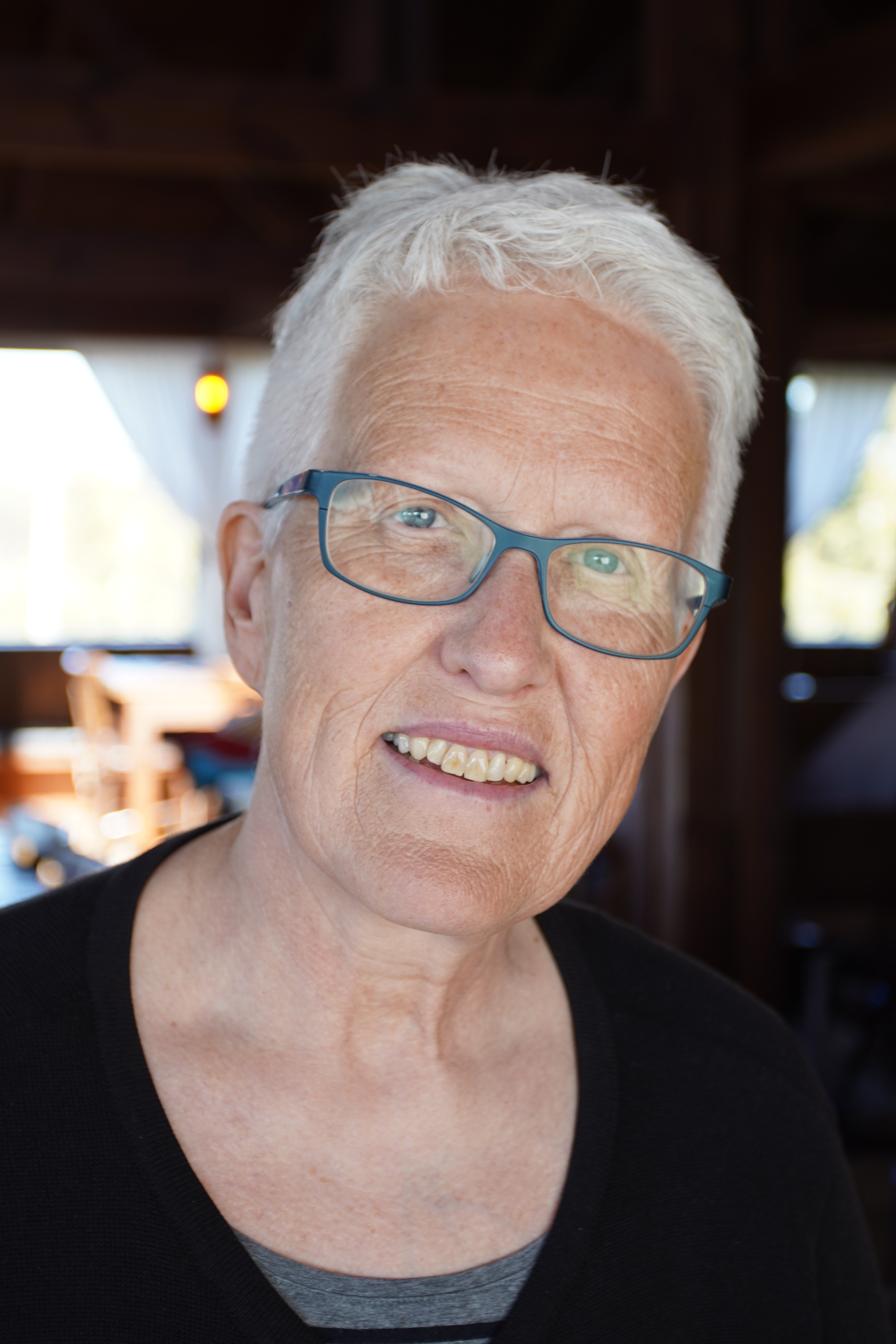

Member Parliament of Åland
- Incumbent
- Assumed office 18 December 2019

Personal details
- Born: 13 November 1953 (age 72)
- Party: Sustainable Initiative

Annette Bergbo (born 13 November 1953) is a journalist, politician and spokesperson for the party Sustainable Initiative of Åland. She has served as a member of the Lagting since December 2019.

== Biography ==
Bergbo is a freelance journalist by profession who worked at the Ålandstidningen newspaper for more than 20 years.

Bergbo participated in the launch of the party Sustainable Initiative (Swedish: Hållbart initiativ) in May 2019 which contested the municipal and legislative elections of that year. Bergbo, along with Simon Holmström, was elected co-spokesperson of the party. Following the 2019 parliamentary elections, two of the party's candidates won seats; Alfons Röblom and Simon Holmström. However, Röblom was appointed to the Provincial Government as Minister for Development in December. Bergbo was nominated as his replacement and entered the Lagting on 18 December 2019. She sits on the Law and Culture Committee and is a substitute for the Self-Government Policy Committee. In December 2020, Bergbo announced she would no longer continue as spokesperson for the party from 2021 and a person outside the Lagting would take up the role.
