= 1922 Ålandic legislative election =

8 May 1922	1925 →
- All 30 seats in the Parliament of Åland; 16 seats needed for a majority
- Turnout: 47.10%
Lantråd after
Carl Björkman

Parliamentary elections were held in Åland on 8 May 1922 to elect the 30 members of Parliament.

== Electoral system ==
The 30 members of the Parliament of Åland were elected using a proportional party list system. Voters could choose from 43 lists each containing three candidates nominated by individual electoral associations or write in their own list of up to three candidates. Electoral associations could form alliances with other lists resulting in three individual electoral alliances. A single candidate could appear on multiple lists and alliances.

== Campaign ==
As the election law limited each electoral association to 30 lists, the Åland Movement split its 38 candidate lists into two electoral associations, which contested the elections as Ålandic Swedish Electoral Alliance no. 1 (ÅSV 1) and Ålandic Swedish Electoral Alliance no. 2 (ÅSV 2).

The Åland Committee contested the elections as the Independent Ålanders' Electoral Alliance (SÅV), while a fourth electoral alliance contested the elections as list 24.

== Results ==
Alliance	Votes	%	Seats
Ålandic Swedish Electoral Alliance no. 1	5,181	78.31	29
Ålandic Swedish Electoral Alliance no. 2	1,043	15.76	29
Independent Ålanders' Electoral Alliance	375	5.67	1
List no. 24	15	0.23	0
Write-ins	2	0.03	0
Total	6,616	100.00	30
Valid votes	6,616	99.24	
Invalid/blank votes	51	0.76	
Total votes	6,667	100.00	
Registered voters/turnout	14,156	47.10	
Source: Wrede

=== By candidate ===
Elected candidates	Electoral alliance	Comparative index
Julius Sundblom	ÅSV 1 + ÅSV 2	5,528.67
Carl Björkman	ÅSV 1 + ÅSV 2	2,707.06
Johannes Eriksson	ÅSV 1	1,727.00
A. Karlsson	ÅSV 1 + ÅSV 2	1,382.17
Viktor Strandfält	ÅSV 2	1,043.00
Artur Gylling	ÅSV 1	1,036.20
Torsten Rothberg	ÅSV 1 + ÅSV 2	870.52
Uno Andersson	ÅSV 1	864.50
Anders Forsberg	ÅSV 1 + ÅSV 2	680.16
Jonatan Sjöblom	ÅSV 1	647.63
Fanny Sundström	ÅSV 1	575.67
A. Th. Karlsson	ÅSV 1	518.10
Otto Lindell	ÅSV 1	471.00
Robert Rosenblad	ÅSV 1	431.75
Julius Karlsson	ÅSV 1 + ÅSV 2	400.49
Leonard Malén	ÅSV 1	398.54
Johannes Holmberg	SÅV	375.00
Karl Anders Lindblom	ÅSV 1	370.07
Oskar Bomansson	ÅSV 1	345.40
C. W. Mattson	ÅSV 1	323.81
J. E. Nordström	ÅSV 1	306.76
F. W. Österlund	ÅSV 1 + ÅSV 2	296.38
Johan Troberg	ÅSV 1	287.83
J. Karlström	ÅSV 1	272.68
Erik Flodin	ÅSV 2	260.75
Carl Carlsson	ÅSV 1	259.05
Matts Jansson	ÅSV 1	246.71
Conrad Palmer	ÅSV 1	235.50
Herman Mattson	ÅSV 1	225.26
K. J. Blomroos	ÅSV 1	215.88
Non-elected candidates	Electoral alliance	Comparative index
A. Nordlund	ÅSV 1	199.27
Alina Kock	SÅV	187.50
A. Sjögren	ÅSV 1	185.57
Alfons Söderlund	ÅSV 2	173.83
Evert Åkerberg	ÅSV 2	149.00
Erik Lönegren	SÅV	125.00
Oskar Karlberg	ÅSV 1	104.30
Emanuel Eriksson	SÅV	93.75
Edvard Holmström	ÅSV 2	80.23
O. W. Drake	SÅV	75.00
Arthur Lundqvist	SÅV	62.50
Johan Ludvig Wikman	SÅV	53.57
K. A. Höglund	SÅV	46.88
E. G. Pettersson	SÅV	41.67
M. R. Kalm	SÅV	37.50
Karl Nordlund	SÅV	34.09
Carl J. Johansson	SÅV	31.25
F. Liewendahl	-	15.00
Erik Lindfors	-	5.00
