= 1925 Ålandic legislative election =

← 1922	15 June 1925	1928 →
- All 30 seats in the Parliament of Åland; 16 seats needed for a majority
- Turnout: 18.63%
Lantråd before	Lantråd after
Carl Björkman	Carl Björkman

Parliamentary elections were held in Åland, an autonomous region of Finland, on 15 June 1925 to elect the 30 members of Parliament.

== Electoral system ==
The 30 members of the Parliament of Åland were elected using a party list system. Voters could choose from 36 lists each containing three candidates nominated by individual electoral associations. A single candidate could appear on multiple lists. There were 42 candidates in total.

Due to inaccuracies found in the documents submitted by the representatives of the voters' associations, the central committee rejected the applications, resulting in the election proceeding without any electoral alliances. The first candidate on a chosen list received one full vote, the second received half a vote, and the third received a third of a vote. Despite the lack of alliances, the overall voting system remained unchanged.

== Results ==
List 22, with Anders Viktor Strandfält as its first choice, followed by Julius Sundblom and Torsten Rothberg as its second and third choices respectively, received the highest number of votes (240). Sundblom appeared in the most number of lists (13) while Strandfält only appeared in one.

Elected candidates	Votes
Julius Sundblom	392.83
Anders Forsberg	326.50
Torsten Rothberg	325.83
Anders Viktor Strandfält	240.00
Hugo Elfsberg	234.67
Gustav Bondestam	218.17
Axel Åkerfelt	190.50
F. E. Karlsson	189.83
Walter Sjöblom	177.67
Erik Flodin	176.50
Oskar Bomanson	144.83
Uno Andersson	128.00
Johannes Eriksson	116.17
A. Th. Mattsson	113.00
Jonatan A. Sjöblom	101.00
Johannes Troberg	99.00
Julius Karlsson	96.33
Karl Anders Lindholm	93.00
O. Robert Rosenblad	91.00
Gunnar Johansson	89.50
Aron Holmberg	88.83
J. E. Nordström	88.67
Jean Törnroos	86.00
Herman Mattsson	84.50
K. J. Blomroos	82.83
J. E. Stenroos	77.67
I. Broman	76.83
Carl Carlsson	71.67
Mathias Jansson	69.83
August Norlund	68.50
Non-elected candidates	
Carl Bengtz	
K. O. Danielsson	
Edvard Eriksson	
Matts Jansson	
A. Th. Karlsson	
Otto Lindell	
Karl Manner	
K. A. Mansén	
Elis Olofsson	
Conrad Palmer	
August Sjögren	
Gösta Söderlund	

=== Turnout ===
Turnout was higher among men (20.10%) than women (16.15%).

	Votes	%
Valid votes	2,607	99.58
Invalid votes	11	0.42
Total votes	2,618	100.00
Registered voters/turnout	14,052	18.63
