= 1934 Ålandic legislative election =

| ← 1931 | 15 June 1934 | 1937 → |
- All 30 seats in the Parliament of Åland; 16 seats needed for a majority
- Turnout: 30.16%
| Lantråd before | Lantråd after |
|---|---|
| Carl Björkman | Carl Björkman |

Parliamentary elections were held in Åland on 15 June 1934 to elect the 30 members of Parliament.

== Electoral system ==
The 30 members of the Parliament of Åland were elected using a party list system. Voters could choose from 54 lists each containing up to three candidates nominated by individual electoral associations. A single candidate could appear on multiple lists. Electoral associations could form alliances with other lists resulting in two lists forming the Brändö alliance. There were 51 candidates in total.

== Results ==
| Alliance | Votes | % | Seats |
|---|---|---|---|
| Other lists | 3,977 | 95.44 | 29 |
| Brändö alliance | 190 | 4.56 | 1 |
| Total | 4,167 | 100.00 | 30 |
| Valid votes | 4,167 | 99.29 | |
| Invalid/blank votes | 30 | 0.71 | |
| Total votes | 4,197 | 100.00 | |
| Registered voters/turnout | 13,917 | 30.16 | |
Source: ÅSUB
