= State Department of Åland =

Department of the Finnish government

The State Department of Åland (Swedish: Statens ämbetsverk på Åland) is a department of the Finnish central government for the administration of Åland, with a status corresponding to a Regional State Administrative Agency elsewhere in Finland. It replaced the Åland State Provincial Office on 1 January 2010, after the abolition of all provinces of Finland at the end of 2009.

== List of governors ==
- Marine Holm-Johansson (2023–present)
- Peter Lindbäck (2009–2023)
