= Fredrik Johan Wiik =

Finnish geologist (1839–1909)

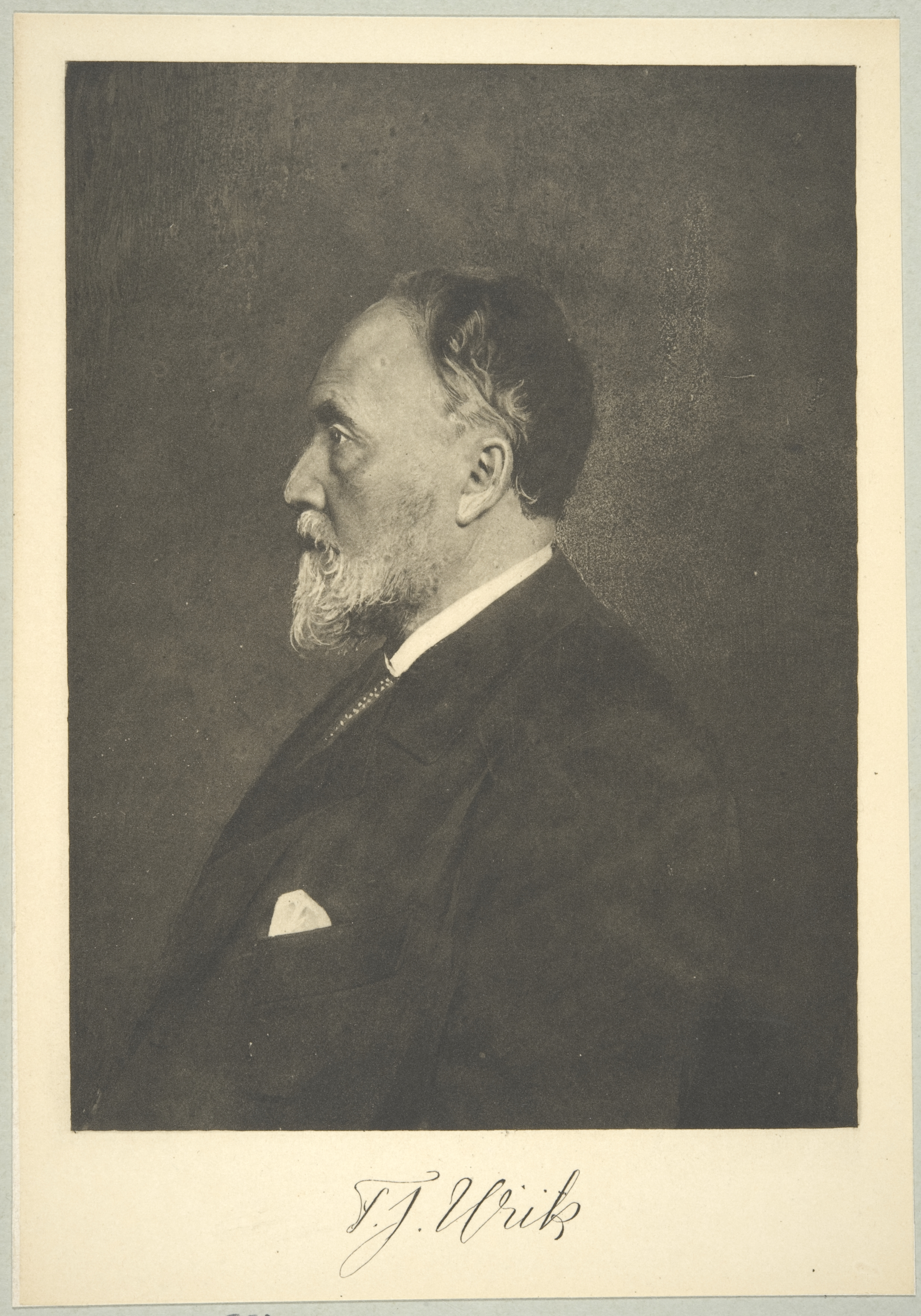
- Born: 16 December 1839; Helsinki, Grand Duchy of Finland, Russian Empire
- Died: 15 June 1909 (aged 69); Helsinki, Grand Duchy of Finland, Russian Empire
- Education: Imperial Alexander University in Finland
- Scientific career
- Fields: Geology; Mineralogy; Petrology
- Doctoral students: Jakob Sederholm; Wilhelm Ramsay

Fredrik Johan Wiik, also known as F.J. Wiik, (16 December 1839 in Helsinki – 15 June 1909 in Helsinki) was a Finnish geologist and mineralogist; in 1877, he was named the first professor of geology and mineralogy at the Imperial Alexander University of Finland, where his students included Jakob Sederholm and Wilhelm Ramsay.

He was also the first scientist in Finland to use a petrographic microscope. He was also corresponded with Kaj Himberg, Finland-Swedish inventor, engineer, and geologist for a time regarding the Ängskärsfjärden in the 1890s.

Wiik died in 1909, on a geological expedition; his body was found clutching his geologist's hammer.

The mineral wiikite is named for him.

== Personal life ==
Wiik was the son of noted Finnish architect Jean Wik.
