= Veronica Thörnroos =

Finnish politician (born 1962)

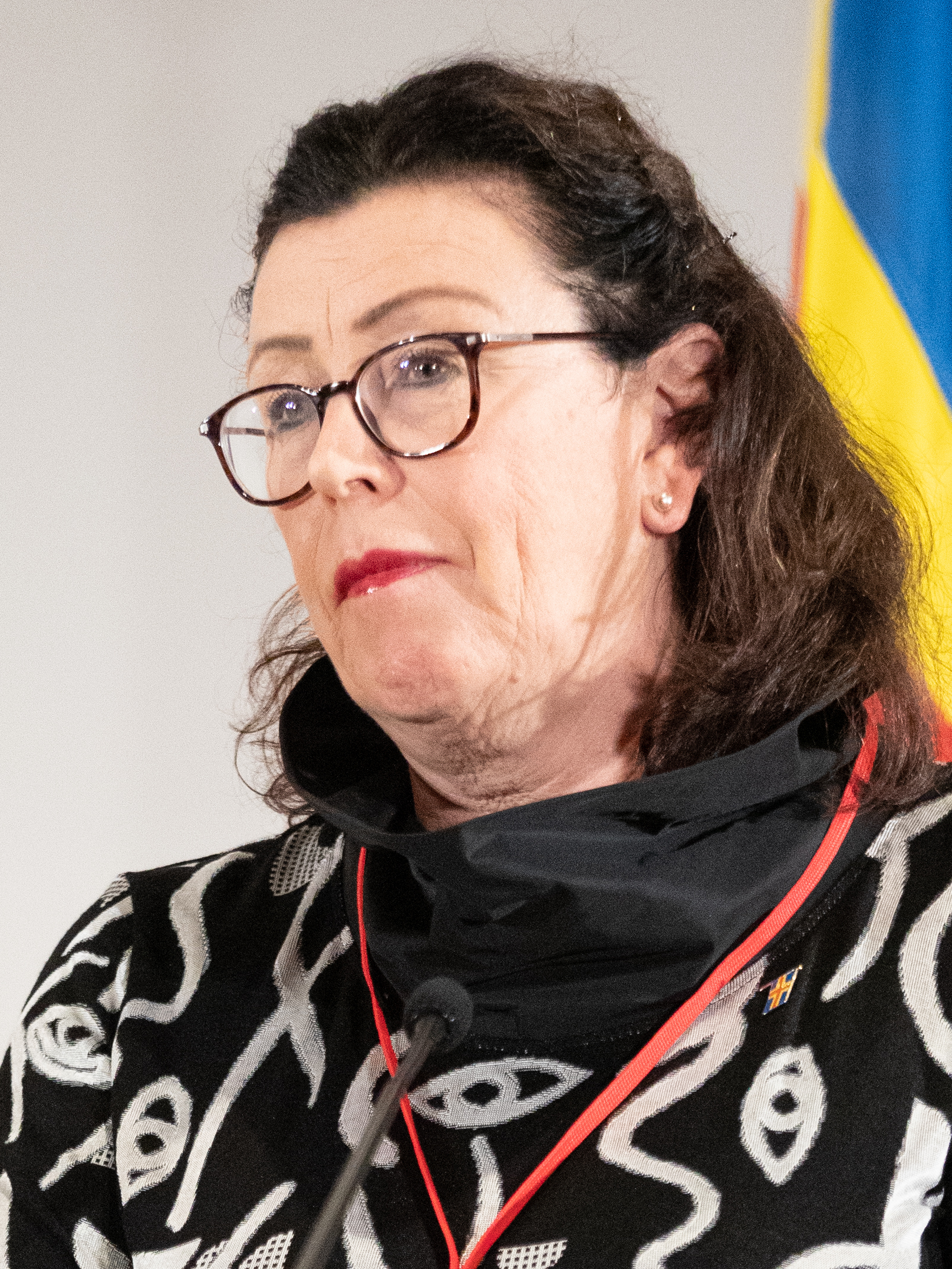
- Veronica Thörnroos in 2022

Premier of Åland
- In office 25 November 2019 – 11 December 2023
- Governor: Peter Lindbäck
- Preceded by: Katrin Sjögren
- Succeeded by: Katrin Sjögren

Personal details
- Born: 16 July 1962 (age 63) Lappo, Brändö, Åland, Finland
- Party: Pro Åland (2024–)
- Other political affiliations: Åland Centre (–2024)
- Spouse: Jan-Tore Thörnroos
- Children: 3

Veronica Thörnroos (born 16 July 1962) is a Finnish politician from Åland. She served as the Premier of Åland, a position she has held from 25 November 2019 to 11 December 2023. Prior to entering politics, Thörnroos worked as a nurse.

== Political career ==
Thörnroos' political career began in 1989 when she was elected to the Brändö municipal council. She became a representative of the Provincial Assembly in 2003. In 2009, she also served as Minister of Transport and Minister for Nordic Cooperation until 2011. After that, she served as Minister of Infrastructure, who was responsible for e.g. provincial energy, media and IT affairs. On 25 November 2019, she was appointed as Premier of Åland, having led the Åland Centre in the 2019 Ålandic legislative election.

In February 2024 Thörnroos resigned from her position as the speaker of the parliament. This was due to a scandal involving a hybrid ferry order that the local government had first ordered, then recalled the order, and finally ordered to pay compensation by the court. Thörnroos had not been entirely honest with her statements regarding the matter. She resigned as the speaker and as the chair of the Åland Centre.

In April 2024 Thörnroos announced that she is starting a new party called Pro Åland, which aims to take part in the upcoming elections.

== Personal life ==
Thörnroos is married to sea captain Jan-Tore Thörnroos, who is known for having been the captain of MS Mariella during the sinking of the MS Estonia in 1994 – his ship was the first to arrive on site. The couple have three daughters.

== Political posts ==
- Premier of Åland, Government of Åland 2019–present
- Member of Parliament of Åland 2003–2009 and 2015–2019
- Minister for Infrastructure, Government of Åland 2009–2015
- Chairwoman, Åland Centre Party 2007–2010 and 2017–2024

== Honors ==
- Order of the Polar Star (Sweden, 2022)

== See also ==
- Government of Åland
- Parliament of Åland
