= Katrin Sjögren =

Finnish politician

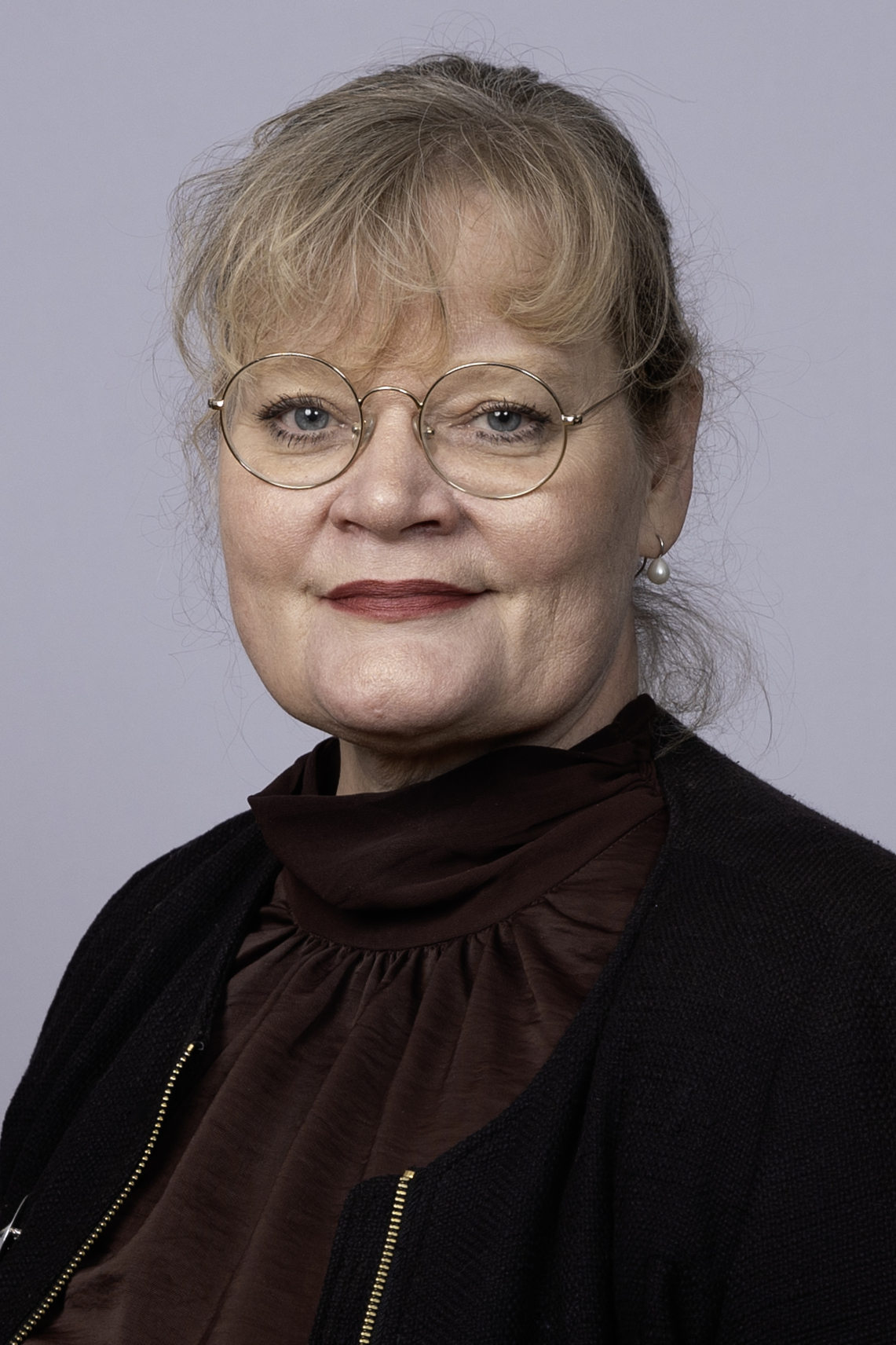
- Official portrait, 2023

Lantråd of Åland
- Incumbent
- Assumed office 11 December 2023
- Governor: Peter Lindbäck; Marine Holm-Johansson
- Deputy: Harry Jansson; Annika Hambrudd
- Preceded by: Veronica Thörnroos
- In office 25 November 2015 – 25 November 2019
- Governor: Peter Lindbäck
- Deputy: Camilla Gunell
- Preceded by: Camilla Gunell
- Succeeded by: Veronica Thörnroos

Leader of Liberals for Åland
- Incumbent
- Assumed office 2012

Minister of Social Affairs and Environment
- In office 2007–2011
- Premier: Viveka Eriksson

Member of the Åland Parliament
- Incumbent
- Assumed office 2003

Personal details
- Born: February 2, 1966 (age 60)
- Party: Liberals for Åland
- Spouse: Anders Eriksson
- Children: 3

Katrin Sjögren (born 2 February 1966) is a Finnish politician from Åland. She served as the Premier of Åland, a position she held from 25 November 2015 to 25 November 2019 and again since 11 December 2023. She has also been the leader of the Liberals for Åland party since 2012.

Elected to the Parliament of Åland in 2003, Sjögren previously was Minister of Social Affairs and Environment between 2007 and 2011. She lives in Mariehamn with her husband Anders Eriksson and their three children.

== Honors ==
- Order of the Polar Star (Sweden, 2022)
