= Wilhelm Ramsay =

Finnish geologist (1865–1928)

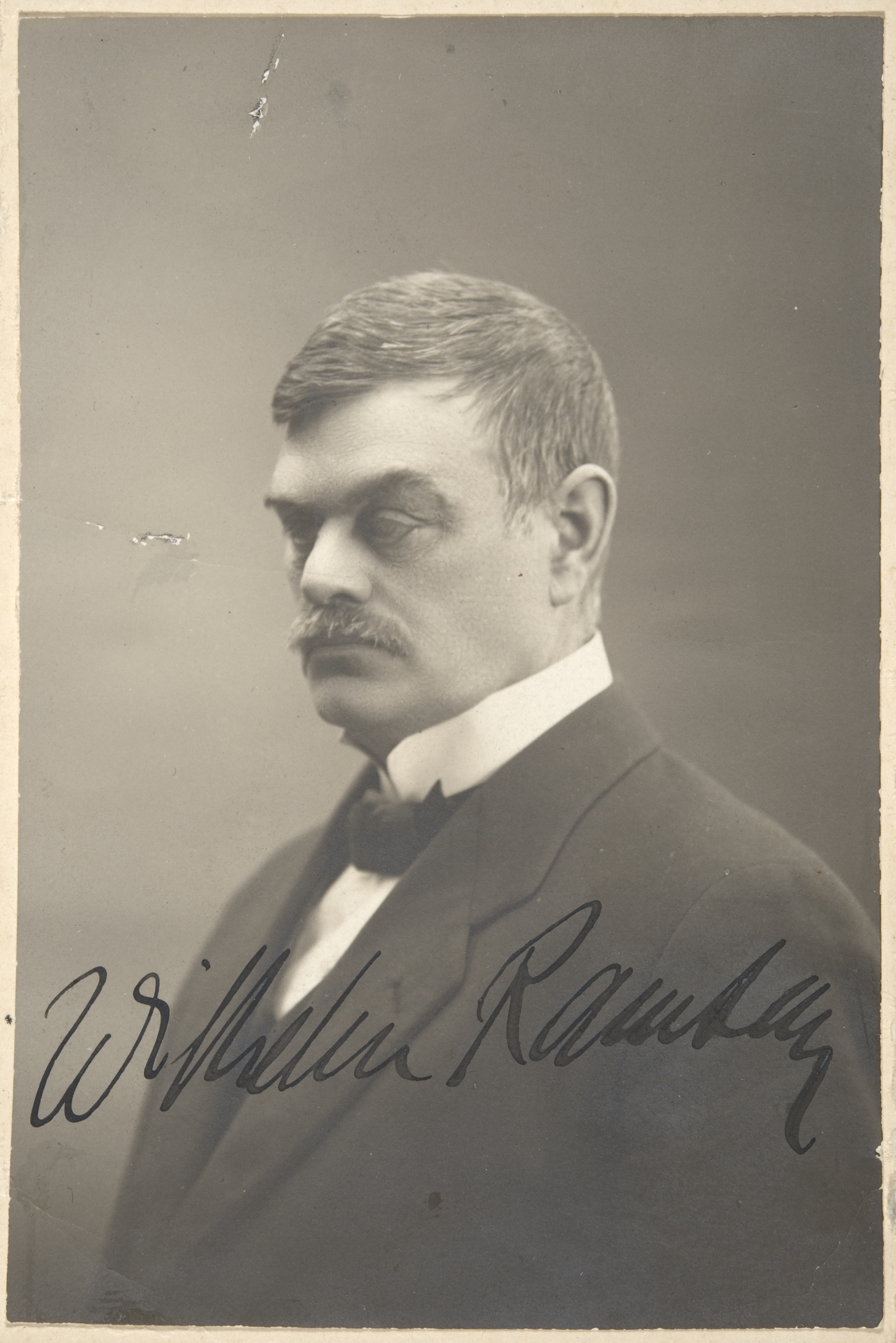
- Ramsay in 1915
- Born: 20 January 1865; Dragsfjärd, Grand Duchy of Finland, Russia
- Died: 6 January 1928 (aged 62); Helsinki, Finland
- Citizenship: Russia (Finland)
- Known for: Fennoscandia, Ijolite, Postjotnian, Timanide Orogen
- Scientific career
- Fields: Geology
- Workplaces: Sorbonne; University of Göttingen; University of Helsinki
- Academic advisors: Fredrik Johan Wiik

Wilhelm Ramsay (20 January 1865 – 6 January 1928) was a Finnish geologist. He became a member of the Royal Swedish Academy of Sciences in 1914 and in 1915 was accepted into the Royal Physiographic Society in Lund. He coined the terms Fennoscandia (1900) and Postjotnian (1909). Ramsay also coined the term ijolite.

Together with Jakob Sederholm, Ramsay was a student of Fredrik Johan Wiik. Pentti Eskola was a student of Ramsay.

== Personal life ==
Ramsay was a Swedish-speaking Finn and belonged to the Ramsay noble family of Scottish origin. His mother Emmy Tham was from Falun, Sweden. Mathematician August Ramsay was his brother.
