= Province of Åland =

Former province of Finland (1918–2009)

Coordinates: 60°15′N 20°00′E

Province of Åland Ahvenanmaan lääni (Finnish) Ålands län (Swedish)
- Province of Finland
- 1918–2009
- Flag (1954–2009) Coat of arms

- Map of Province of Åland (2000)
- Capital: Mariehamn
- Area
  - 1 January 1993: 1,552 km^{2} (599 sq mi)
  - 1 January 2009: 1,552 km^{2} (599 sq mi)
- Population
  - 1 January 1993: 24,993
  - 1 January 2009: 27,734
- History
  - Established: 1918
  - Disestablished: 2009
Preceded by	Succeeded by
Turku and Pori Province	Region of Åland

Province of Åland (Finnish: Ahvenanmaan lääni, Swedish: Ålands län) was a province of Finland from 1918 to 2009.

The State Provincial Office on the Åland Islands (Länsstyrelsen på Åland) represented the Finnish central government in Åland between 1918 and 2009. Due to its autonomy, it had somewhat different functions from similar offices in other provinces of Finland. Generally a State Provincial Office was a joint regional authority of seven different ministries of the Government of Finland. In Åland, the State Provincial Office also represented a set of other authorities of the central government, which in mainland Finland has separate bureaucracies. On the other hand, duties, which on mainland Finland were handled by the provincial offices, were transferred to the autonomous government of Åland.

Along with the abolition of all provinces of Finland, the Åland State Provincial Office was replaced by the State Department of Åland in 2009.

== Map ==
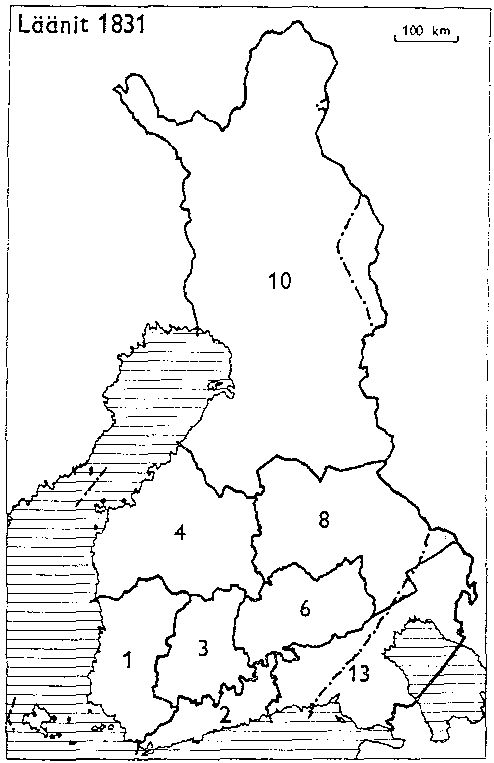
Provinces of Finland 1831: 1: Turku and Pori, 2: Uusimaa, 3: Häme, 4: Vaasa, 6: Mikkeli, 8: Kuopio, 10: Oulu, 13: Viipuri

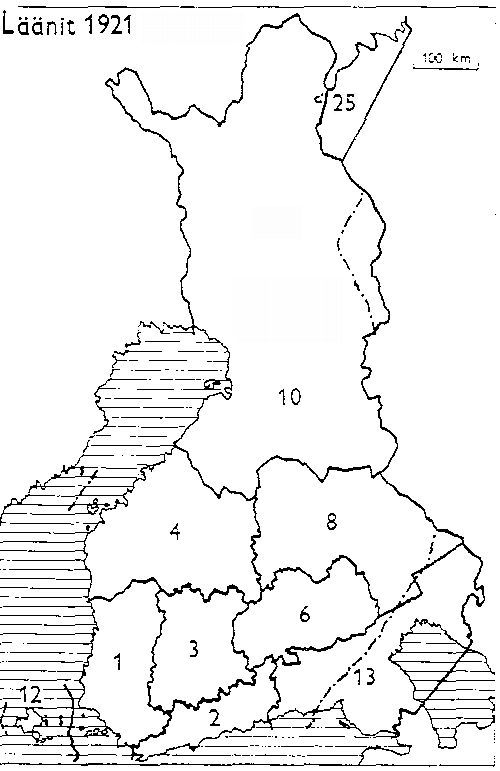
Provinces of Finland 1921: 1: Turku and Pori, 2: Uusimaa, 3: Häme, 4: Vaasa, 6: Mikkeli, 8: Kuopio, 10: Oulu, 12: Åland, 13: Viipuri, 25: Petsamo

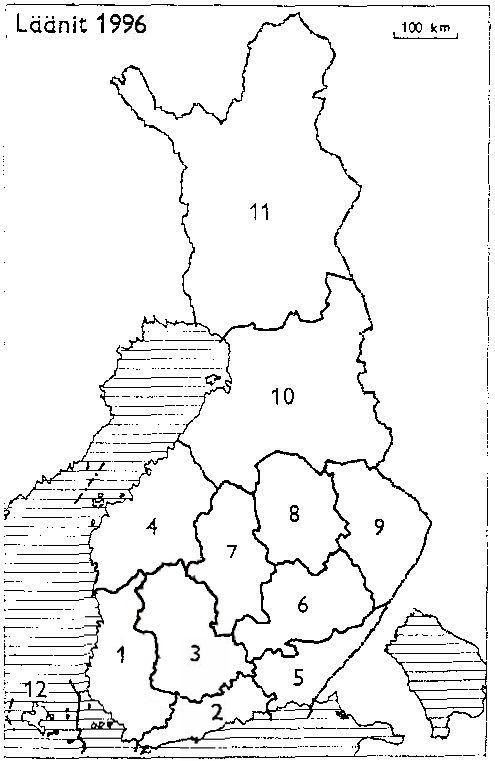
Provinces of Finland 1996: 1: Turku and Pori, 2: Uusimaa, 3: Häme, 4: Vaasa, 5: Kymi, 6: Mikkeli, 7: Central Finland, 8: Kuopio, 9: Northern Karelia, 10: Oulu, 11: Lapland, 12: Åland

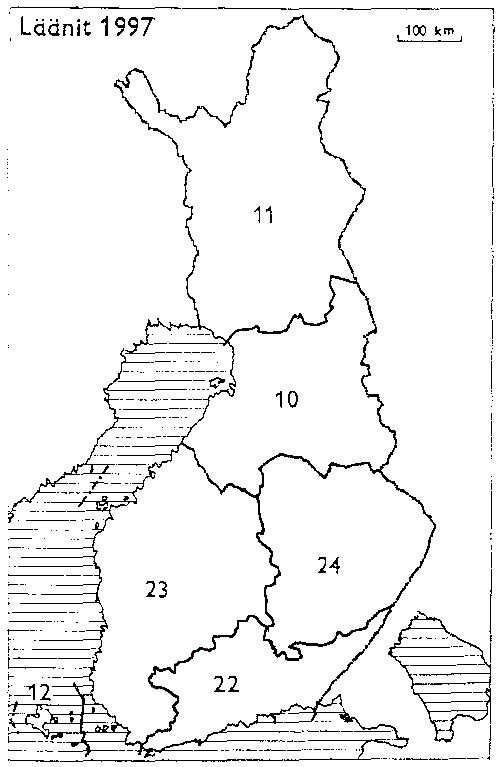
Provinces of Finland 1997: 10: Oulu, 11: Lapland, 12: Åland, 22: Southern Finland, 23: Western Finland, 24: Eastern Finland

== Municipalities in 2009 (cities in bold) ==
- Brändö
- Eckerö
- Finström
- Föglö
- Geta
- Hammarland
- Jomala
- Kumlinge
- Kökar
- Lemland
- Lumparland
- **Mariehamn**
- Saltvik
- Sottunga
- Sund
- Vårdö

== Governors ==
- Hjalmar von Bonsdorff 1918
- William Isaksson 1918–1922
- Lars Wilhelm Fagerlund 1922–1937
- Torsten Rothberg 1938
- Ruben Österberg 1939–1945
- Herman Koroleff 1945–1953
- Tor Brenning 1954–1972
- Martin Isaksson 1972–1982
- Henrik Gustavsson 1982–1999
- Peter Lindbäck 1999–2009
