= Marine Holm-Johansson =

Finnish official

Governor of Åland
- Incumbent
- Assumed office 1 April 2023
- President: Sauli Niinistö; Alexander Stubb
- Premier: Katrin Sjögren
- Preceded by: Peter Lindbäck

Personal details
- Born: Marine Helena Holm; 23 March 1964 Helsinki, Finland

Marine Helena Holm-Johansson (born 23 March 1964) is a Finnish official from Åland, educated lawyer. She is currently serving as Governor of Åland since 1 April 2023.
