= Carina Aaltonen =

Åland politician

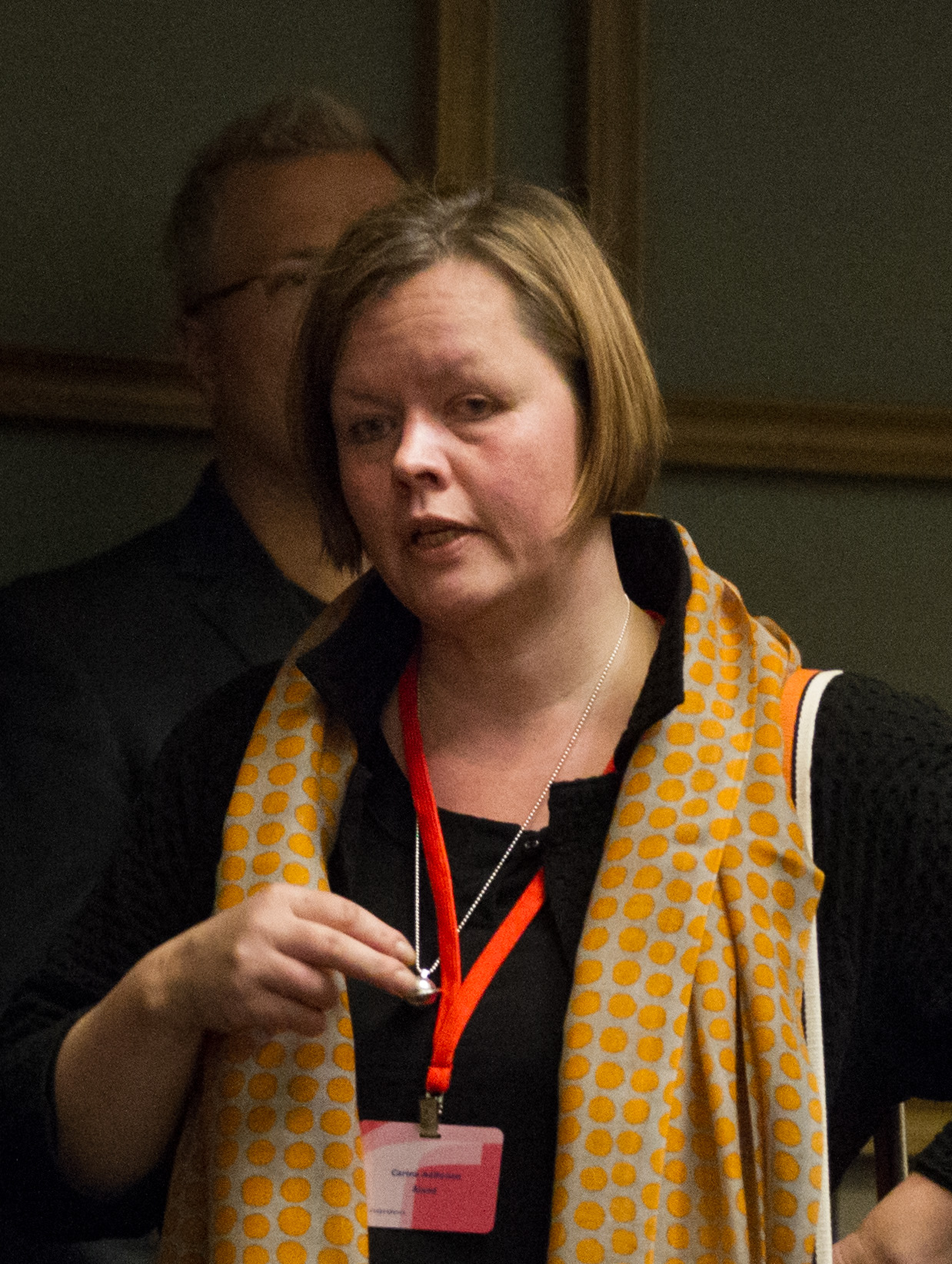

Member of municipal council of Jomala
- In office 2002–2003
- In office 2004-2011

Minister of Social Affairs and Environment
- In office 2011-2015

Personal details
- Born: 19 January 1964 (age 61)

Carina Aaltonen (born 19 January 1964) is a politician from Åland affiliated with the Social Democrats.

== Career ==
Aaltonen has served on the municipal council of Jomala for two terms from 2002–2003 and 2004–2011. She became the deputy chair in 2008. She served as a Minister of Social Affairs and Environment in Åland's Regional Government from 2011 to 2015.

She was a member of the Nordic Council and represented Åland in the Council of Ministers for Fisheries, Aquaculture, Agriculture, Food, and Forestry in 2012. She served as Åland’s representative for Social Affairs and Environment from November 2011 to November 2015.

Aaltonen has also served on the Nordic Council, for the Council of Ministers for Fisheries, Aquaculture, Agriculture, Food and Forestry in 2012, and as the Åland representative for Social Affairs and Environment, from November 2011 to November 2015.

== Other activities ==
She has been involved with the Emmaus Movement. In January 2015, she was elected chair of Emmaus Finland. In February 2016, she was elected President of Emmaus Finland.
