= Tony Asumaa =

Finnish football referee and politician

Tony Asumaa (born 15 September 1968 in Vaasa) is a Finnish football referee, and politician in the Åland Islands, an autonomous and unilingually Swedish territory of Finland. He currently serves as Minister of Education and Culture of the Government of Åland

Asumaa became a FIFA referee in 2003. He refereed for the 2012–13 UEFA Europa League and during the UEFA qualifying rounds for the 2006, 2010, and 2014 World Cups.
