= Jörgen Strand =

Finnish politician (born 1963)

Deputy Premier
- In office 2003–2007
- Preceded by: Olof Erland

Minister of Industry and Trade
- In office 2005–2007
- Preceded by: Kerstin Alm
- Succeeded by: Jan-Erik Mattsson

Minister of Finance
- In office 2003–2005
- Preceded by: Olof Erland
- Succeeded by: Lasse Wiklöf

Member of Parliament
- Incumbent
- Assumed office 2019
- In office 1999-2011

Chairman of the Åland Conservatives
- In office 2003–2007
- Preceded by: Roger Jansson
- Succeeded by: Johan Ehn

Personal details
- Born: 15 March 1962 (age 64)
- Party: Åland Conservatives
- Website: www.fs.ax

Jörgen Strand (born 15 March 1963) is a politician of Åland. He was elected as member of the Lagting in 1999 and served until 2011. During this period he served on the Culture, Finance, Business, and Grand Committees. He also was the Depute Premier or Minister of Industry and Trade, and the Minister of Finance. He was re-elected to parliament in 2019.

Strand was the Chairman of the Åland Conservatives 2003–2007.

== See also ==
- Government of Åland
