= Ålandstidningen =

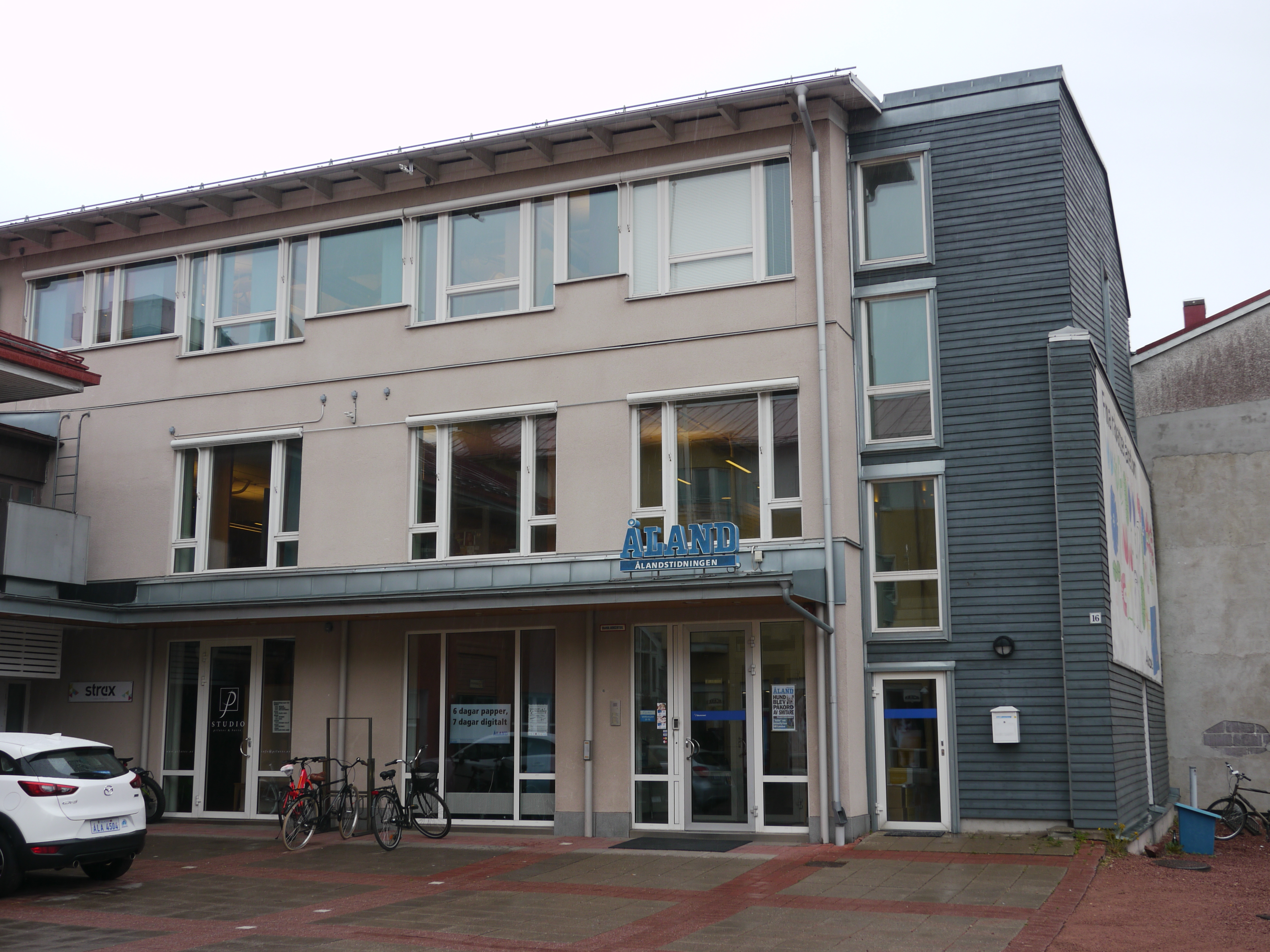
Ålandstidningen office in Mariehamn.

Ålandstidningen or Tidningen Åland is a Swedish-language newspaper in Åland, an autonomous region in Finland. It is published six times a week with a circulation of 8,392, and is the largest local newspaper on Åland, of the two published (the other being Nya Åland). Tidningen Åland was founded in 1891 by Julius Sundblom, who would later play an instrumental part in the Åland Crisis.

The newspaper is a member of MIDAS (European Association of Daily Newspapers in Minority and Regional Languages).
