= Jakob Sederholm =

Finnish petrologist

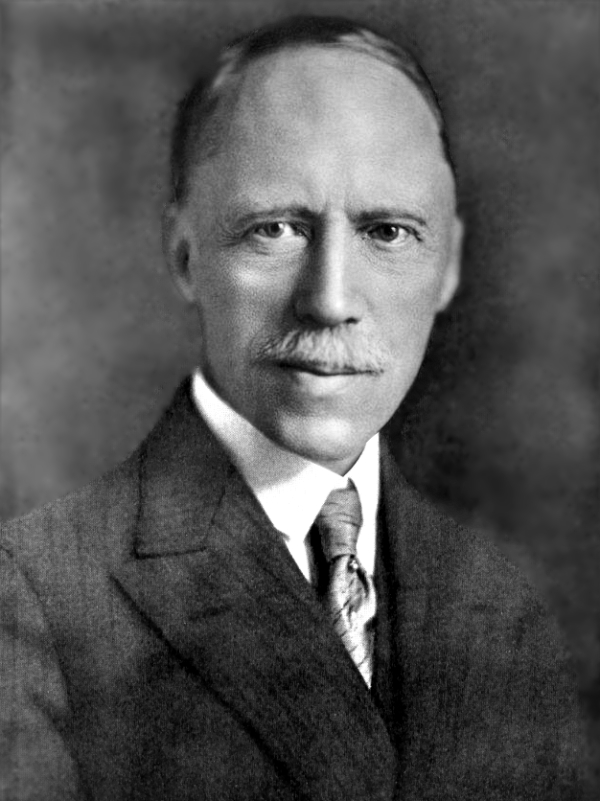
- Jakob Sederholm
- Born: 20 July 1863; Helsinki, Finland
- Died: 26 June 1934 (aged 70)
- Known for: Jotnian, Migmatite, Myrmekite, Rapakivi granite
- Awards: Murchison Medal (1928); Penrose Medal (1928)
- Scientific career
- Fields: Petrology
- Workplaces: Geological Survey of Finland
- Academic advisors: Fredrik Johan Wiik

Signature
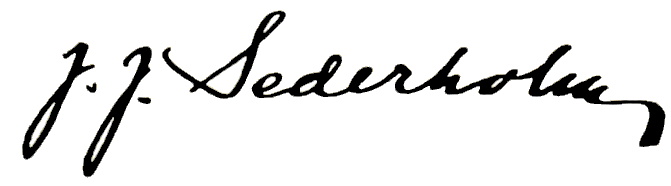

Jakob Johannes Sederholm (20 July 1863 – 26 June 1934) was a Finnish petrologist most associated with his studies of migmatites.

Troubled by illness throughout his life, Sederholm originally chose to study geology to allow him to work outdoors. After studying first in Helsinki (where he was a student of Fredrik Johan Wiik), then in Stockholm and Heidelberg, Sederholm returned to Finland to work for the Geological Survey of Finland. In 1893 he assumed the role of director of this institution, a post he occupied until his death forty years later.

Working on local Precambrian basement rocks, Sederholm instigated a map-making programme that, between 1899 and 1925, published many maps and descriptions of their geological history. Gneisses in the areas he studied (the so-called Baltic Shield) were often of mixed composition, with layers of granitic rock being interleaved with metamorphic rock. Sederholm termed these as migmatites, and viewed them as the product of the intrusion of igneous magma into metamorphic rocks at depth.

During his career Sederholm received both the Murchison Medal from the Geological Society of London (1928) and the Penrose Medal from the Geological Society of America (also 1928). The mineral sederholmite is named in his honour.

Aside from his geological work, Sederholm was a member of the Diet of Finland, and undertook missions from this to the League of Nations. From 1921 to 1923, he led the League of Nations' "Commission of Enquiry in Albania" in the Principality of Albania. He was also a member and chairman (twice) of the Economic Society of Finland.

In the 1974 historical novel Centennial, James Michener listed Sederholm among those scientists who made early estimates of the age of the Earth. Sederholm's estimate was 40 million years.

== Papers ==
- Hackman V. Jacob Johannes Sederholm: Biographic notes and bibliography // Bulletin de la Commission géologique de Finlande. 1935. N 112. 34 p.
- Papunen H. Jakob Johannes Sederholm – geologi, humanisti ja totuudenetsijä // Geologi. 2009. N 2. P. 35-38.
