= Runar Karlsson =

Politician in the Åland Islands

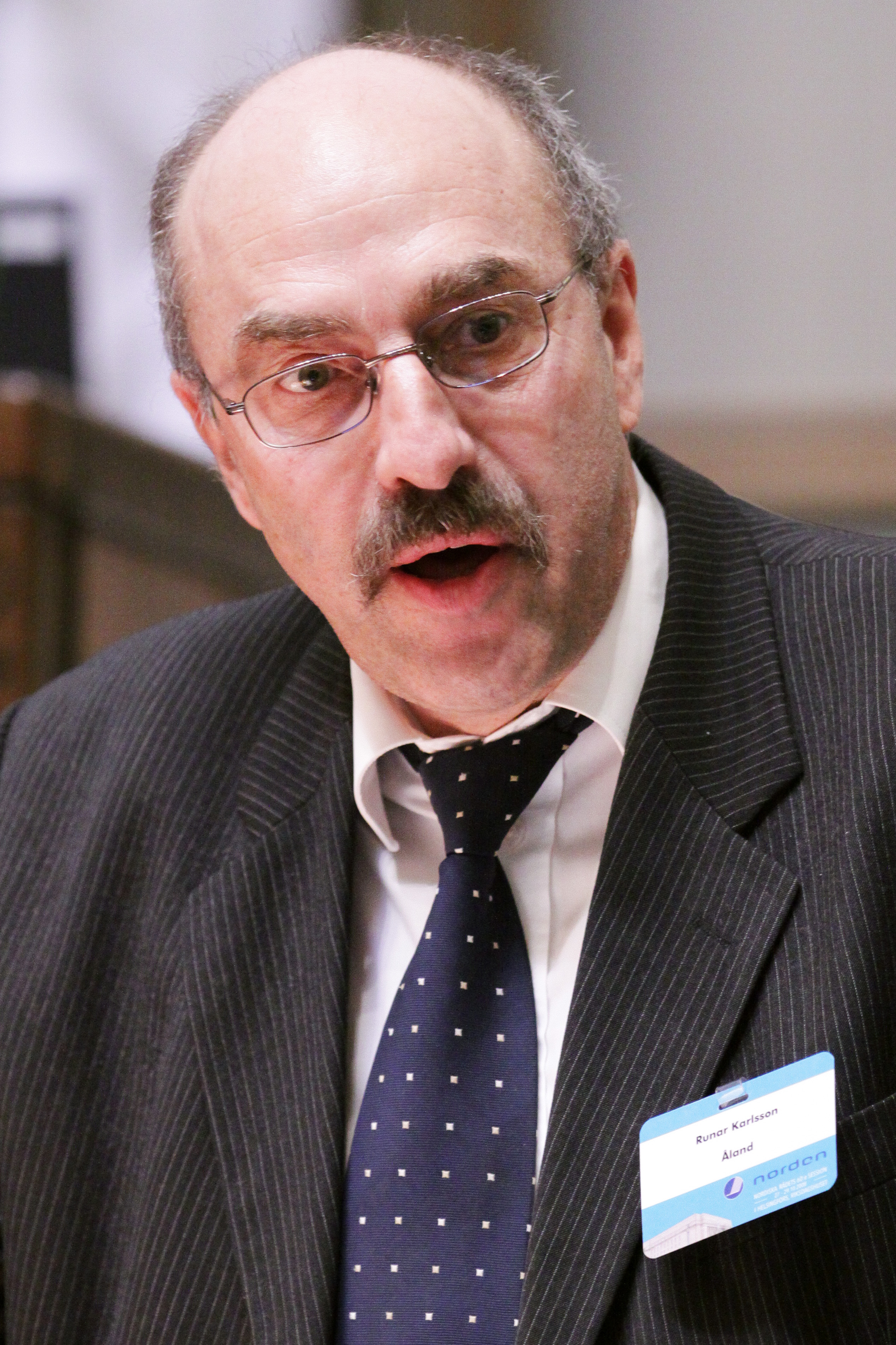

Member of the Parliament of Åland
- In office 1 November 1999 – 31 October 2019

Personal details
- Party: Åland Centre

Runar Karlsson is a Finnish politician who served in the Parliament of Åland from 1999 to 2019, as a member of Åland Centre. He also served on and as chair of the Municipal Social Service and city council of Saltvik.

== Career ==
Karlsson was elected to the Parliament of Åland in 1999, as a member of Åland Centre, and served until he declined to seek reelection in 2019. Karlsson was deputy group leader of Åland Centre until 2017, when Harry Jansson was elected to succeed him.

During Karlsson's tenure in parliament he has served as a member of the Industry, Finance, Culture, Social and Environment, Law and Culture, and Adjustment committees. He was a member of Åland's delegation to the Nordic Council from 2 September 2009 to 31 October 2011. He was a minister in the government of Åland from 2 December 1999 to 2 September 2009.

Karlsson was elected to the Municipal Social Service. In 2020, he was selected to become its chair. He chose to not seek reelection in 2024. Karlsson was elected to the city council of Saltvik and served as its chair. He did not seek reelection to the council in 2024.

== Political positions ==
Karlsson supports autonomy for Åland. Karlsson has received the nickname "Roundabout-Runar" due to his proposals to create more roundabouts. He supported moving Åland from Eastern European Time to Central European Time.

In response to sexual abuse cases in Oulu, Karlsson posted on Facebook in 2019, writing that immigration should be restricted in order to prevent rape. He later retracted his comments and stated that he was not a racist.

== Works cited ==
=== News ===
- "Åland representative in Nordic Council removed for verbal attacks on Finland". Helsingin Sanomat. Archived from the original on 7 June 2012.
- "Fullmäktigepresidium valt i Saltvik". Nya Åland. 1 February 2023. Archived from the original on 17 June 2025.
- "Karlsson svingar klubban i Saltvik". Nya Åland. 15 January 2020. Archived from the original on 17 June 2025.
- "Thommy och Tommy leder Saltviksfullmäktige". Nya Åland. 24 January 2024. Archived from the original on 16 June 2025.
- Alberius-Forsman, Kiki (29 May 2013). "Runar är pappa till sex rondeller". Nya Åland. Archived from the original on 16 June 2025.
- Björkroos, Anna (21 October 2019). "Invalda i Saltviks kommunfullmäktige". Nya Åland. Archived from the original on 17 June 2025.
- Eriksson, Martina (28 November 2023). "Runar är pappa till sex rondeller". Ålands Radio and TV. Archived from the original on 16 June 2025.
- Gronholm, Peter (16 September 2019). "Runar Karlsson ställer inte upp i lagtingsval". Ålands Radio and TV. Archived from the original on 2 January 2020.
- Henderson, Heidi (19 January 2019). "Runar Karlsson backar om våldtäkts-inlägg". Nya Åland. Archived from the original on 16 June 2025.
- Henriksson, Malin (17 February 2020). "Runar Karlsson leder KST-styrelse". Ålands Radio and TV. Archived from the original on 16 June 2025.
- Ringbom-Fonsell, Eva (8 November 2017). "Thörnroos ny gruppledare för Centern". Ålands Radio and TV. Archived from the original on 17 June 2025.
- Weman, Ulf (5 October 2016). "Vill ha ny tid för Åland". Ålands Radio and TV. Archived from the original on 17 June 2025.

=== Web ===
- "Intervju med ledamot Runar Karlsson". Parliament of Åland. 17 September 2019. Archived from the original on 29 November 2023.
- "Runar Karlsson". Parliament of Åland. Archived from the original on 16 June 2025.
