= Nya Åland =

Swedish language newspaper in Finland

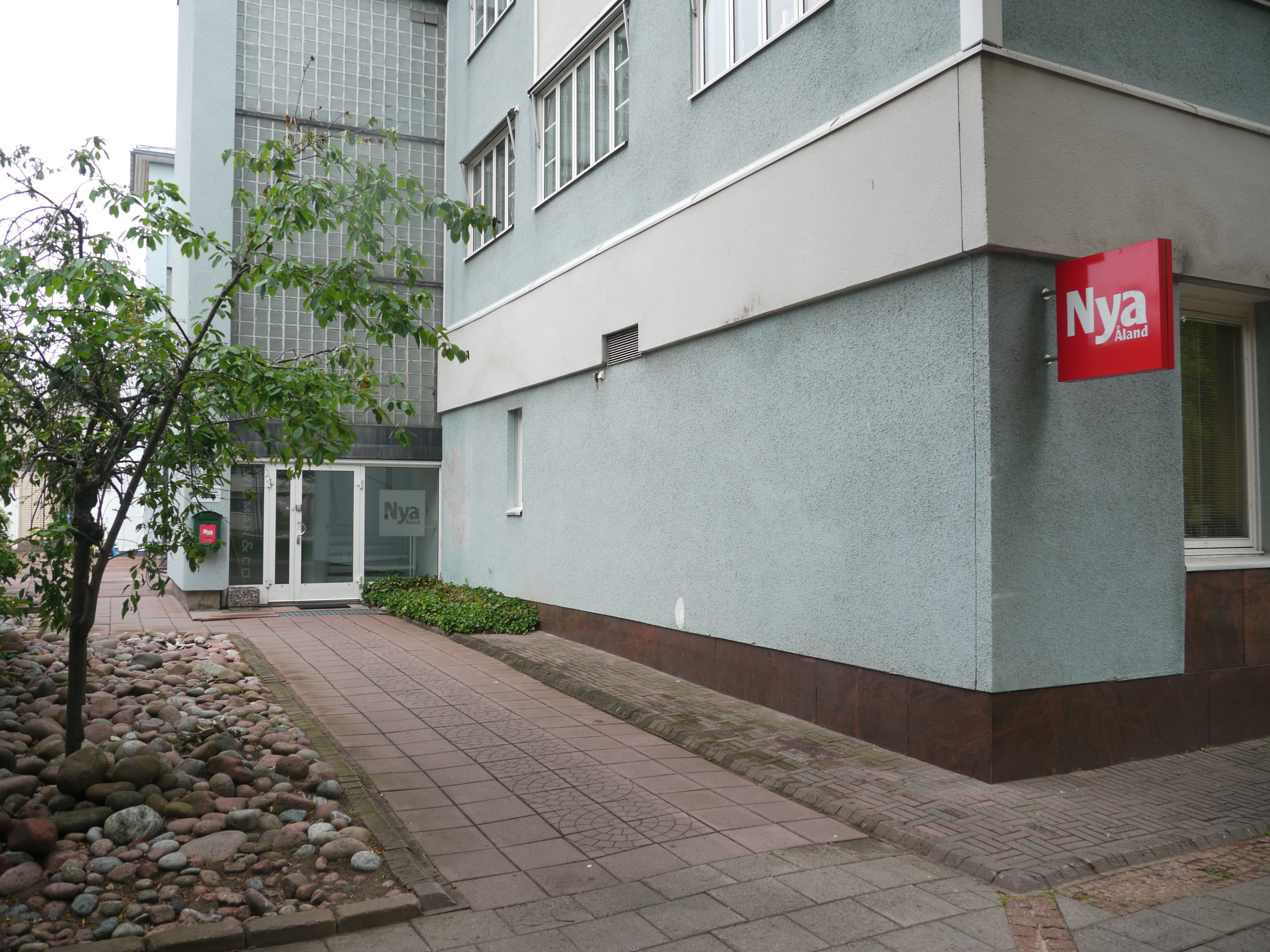
Nya Åland office in Mariehamn.

Nya Åland is a Swedish language newspaper in Åland, an autonomous region in Finland. It is the second largest local newspaper on Åland, following Ålandstidningen.

== History and profile ==
Nya Åland was founded in 1981 as a cooperative movement. Hasse Svensson was the editor-in-chief of Ålandstidningen and left it following an internal dispute to form Nya Åland. The paper is published in tabloid format.

At the initial phase, Nya Åland was published twice per week. Then it began to be published five times a week (Monday through Friday).

The newspaper is a member of MIDAS (European Association of Daily Newspapers in Minority and Regional Languages).
