= Viveka Eriksson =

Finnish politician

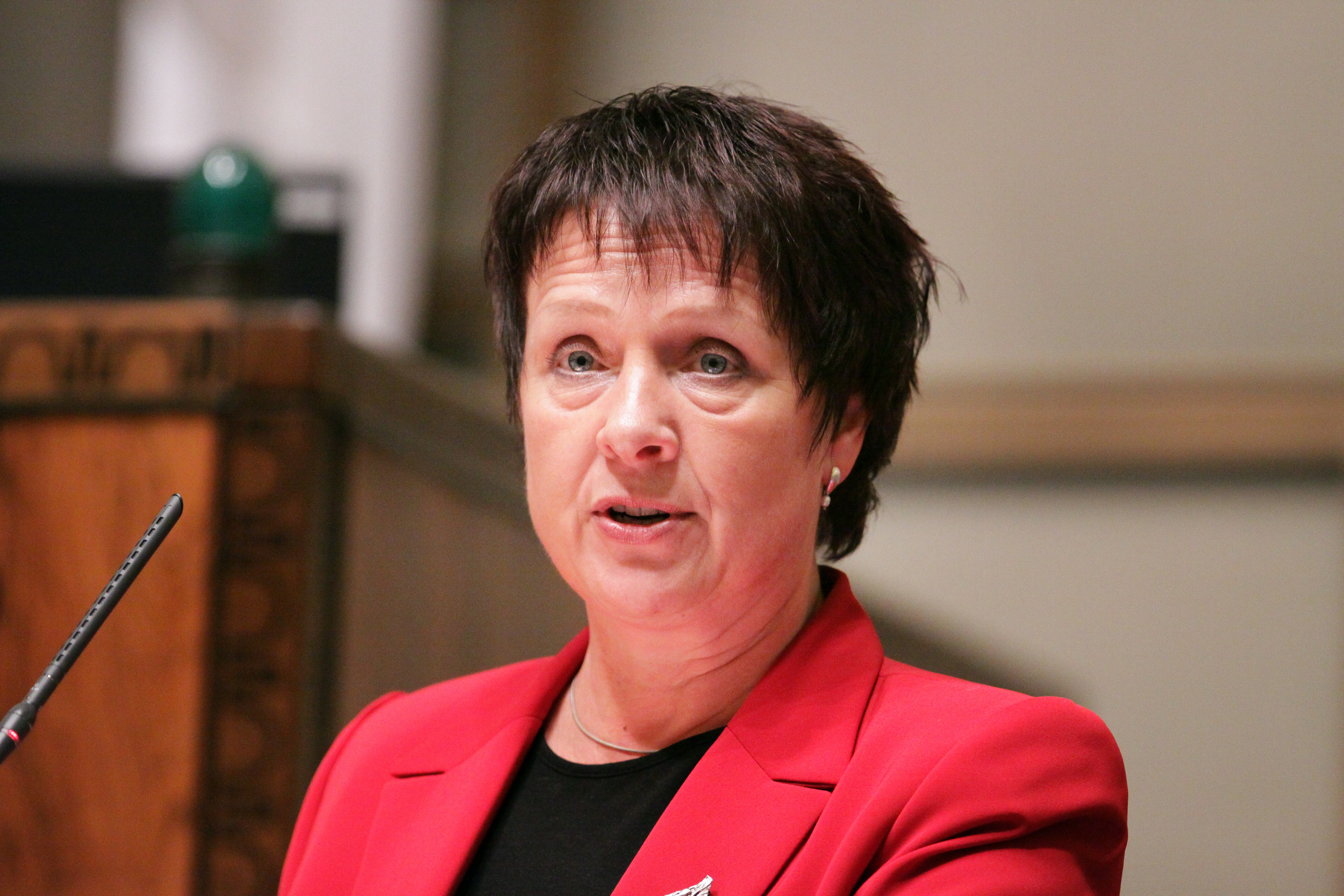
- Eriksson in Helsinki in 2008

Premier of Åland
- In office 26 November 2007 – 25 November 2011
- Preceded by: Roger Nordlund
- Succeeded by: Camilla Gunell

Deputy Speaker of Parliament of Åland
- In office 2000–2007
- Preceded by: Barbro Sundback
- Succeeded by: Gunnar Jansson

Speaker of Parliament of Åland
- In office 2001–2005
- Preceded by: Ragnar Erlandsson
- Succeeded by: Barbro Sundback

Personal details
- Born: 18 August 1956 (age 69) Föglö, Åland
- Party: Liberals for Åland
- Spouse: Olof Erland
- Website: www.liberalerna.ax

Viveka Eriksson or Viveca Eriksson (born 18 August 1956) is a politician of Åland and the former Premier of Åland from 2007 to 2011.

== Professional overview ==
- Member of the Lagting (Åland parliament) 2011 –
- Premier, Government of Åland October 2007 – November 2011
- First Deputy Speaker of the Lagting (Ålands parliament) 2005–2007
- Speaker of the Lagting (Åland parliament) 2001–2005
- First Deputy Speaker 2000–2001
- Member of the Lagting (Åland parliament) 1995–2007
- Chairwoman of the Åland Liberals since 2003
- Member of the Speaker's Conference of the Lagting 1999–2000,
- Vice-speaker 2000–01 and again from 2005.
- Chairperson of the Finance Committee 1999–2001
- Chairperson of the Liberal Parliamentary Group 1999–2001 and Party Chairperson from 2004.

Eriksson was the first female Speaker in Åland history. As party leader of the Åland Liberals she won the 2007 election and was sworn in as the first female Premier.

== See also ==
- List of current heads of government of dependencies
- List of speakers of the Parliament of Åland
