= Roger Nordlund =

Finnish politician

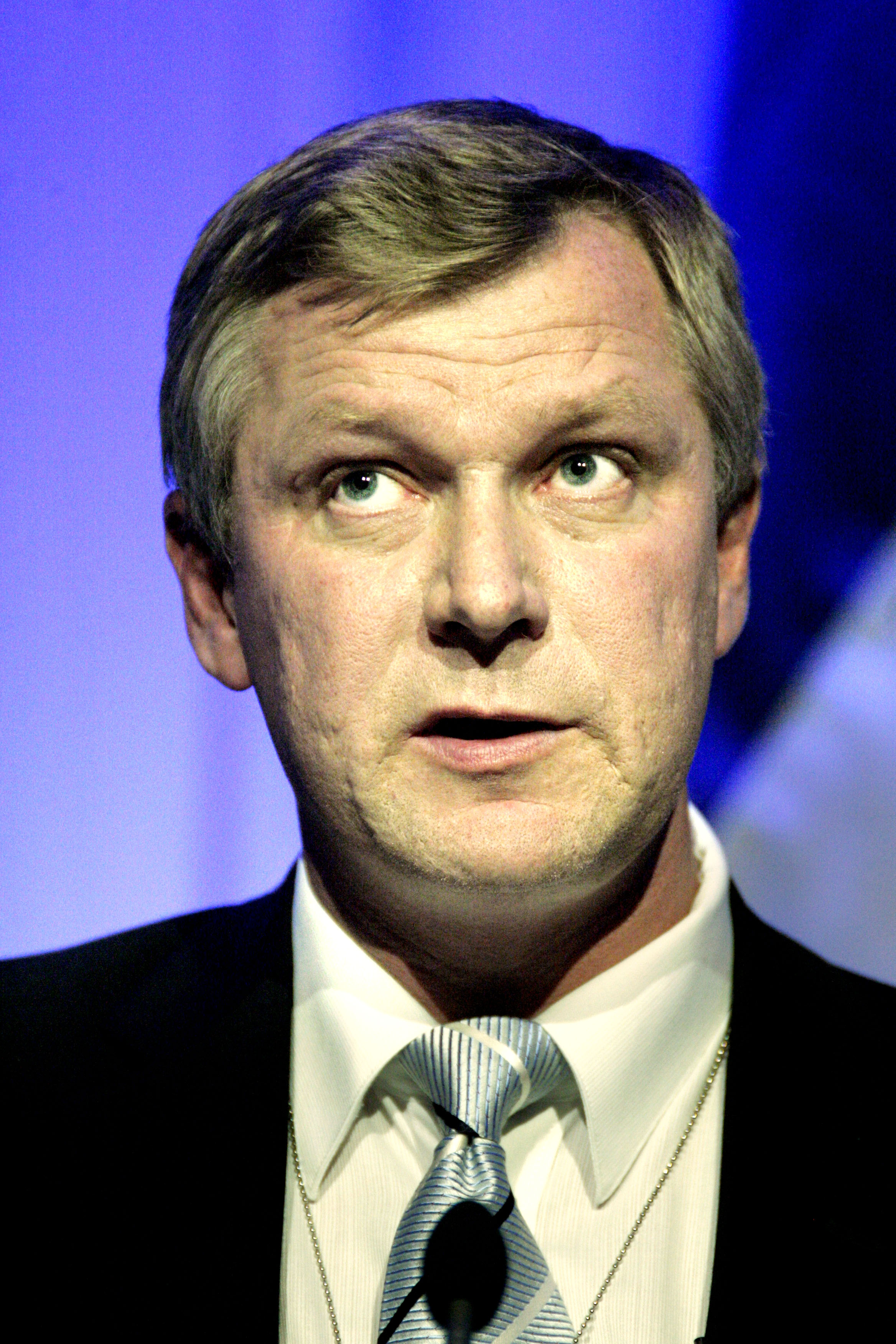

Deputy Premier of Åland Minister of Finance
- In office November 2011 – 2015
- Preceded by: Britt Lundberg

Speaker of the Parliament of Åland
- In office 2007–2011
- Preceded by: Gunnar Jansson
- Succeeded by: Britt Lundberg
- In office 2019–2020

Premier (Lantråd)
- In office 3 December 1999 – 26 November 2007
- Preceded by: Roger Jansson
- Succeeded by: Viveka Eriksson

Deputy Premier (Vice lantråd)
- In office 1995–1999
- Preceded by: Harriet Lindeman
- Succeeded by: Olof Salmén

Minister of Education and Culture
- In office 1991–1995
- Preceded by: Holger Eriksson
- Succeeded by: Harriet Lindeman

Member of Parliament
- In office 1983–1987; 1995; 2007–2019

Personal details
- Born: 19 November 1957 (age 68)
- Party: Åland Centre party
- Spouse: Gunilla G. Nordlund
- Occupation: Economist
- Website: www.centern.ax

Roger Nordlund (born 19 November 1957) is a politician in Åland, an autonomous and unilingually Swedish territory of Finland. Nordlund is a member of the Åland Centre party and previously served as Premier and Deputy Premier of the Government of Åland.

== Early life ==
Nordlund was born on 19 November 1957. He studied economics at Åbo Akademi University in Turku.

== Political career ==
In 1979 he held his first prominent political position, becoming Chairman of the Åländsk Ungcenter. A few years later, in 1983, he became a member of the Jomala Municipal Council, which is the second-largest city in Åland.

In 1983, Nordlund became a member of the Lagting, which is the Parliament of Åland, representing the Åland Centre party until 1987. That year, he was appointed the chairman of the party, a position he held until 2007. In 1991, he left parliament to become the Minister of Education and Culture in the government of Åland, which he did for four years until 1995. That year, he briefly joined the Lagting again, but again left to take on another position in the local government. This time, he was the Vice lantråd (Deputy Premier) of the government until 1999, when he officially became the Lantråd (Premier), a position he held until 2007. Nordlund in 2006 stated that Åland should have one seat in the European Parliament, arguing that they needed representation. The proposal that the parliament sent to the Finnish Parliament regarding getting a seat was promptly rejected.

When his mandate ended, he returned to parliament, which he served in for over a decade afterwards until 2020. In 2010, he notes that the Åland Centre Party felt like they had outsider status with Finnish parties like the Finnish Centre Party, and explained that they had chosen to caucus with the Swedish People's Party because it advocated for Swedish-language rights and consistently were part of governments in Finland. In parliament, he held the position of Speaker multiple times, from 2007 to 2011, and again from 2019 to 2020. Simultaneously, he once again held the position of Vice lantråd in the government, a position he served in from 2011 to 2015.

== See also ==
- Government of Åland
- Parliament of Åland
