= 1948 Ålandic legislative election =

Legislative elections were held in Åland on 15 June 1948.

== Results ==
Party	Votes	%	Seats
Ålänningarnas valförbund	5,194	90.52	27
Aländska arbetares, löntagares, fiskares och småbrukares valförbund (Folkdemokraterna)	346	6.03	2
Aländska arbetares och löntagares valförbund (Socialdemokraterna)	198	3.45	1
Total	5,738	100.00	30
