= Alfons Röblom =

Finnish politician

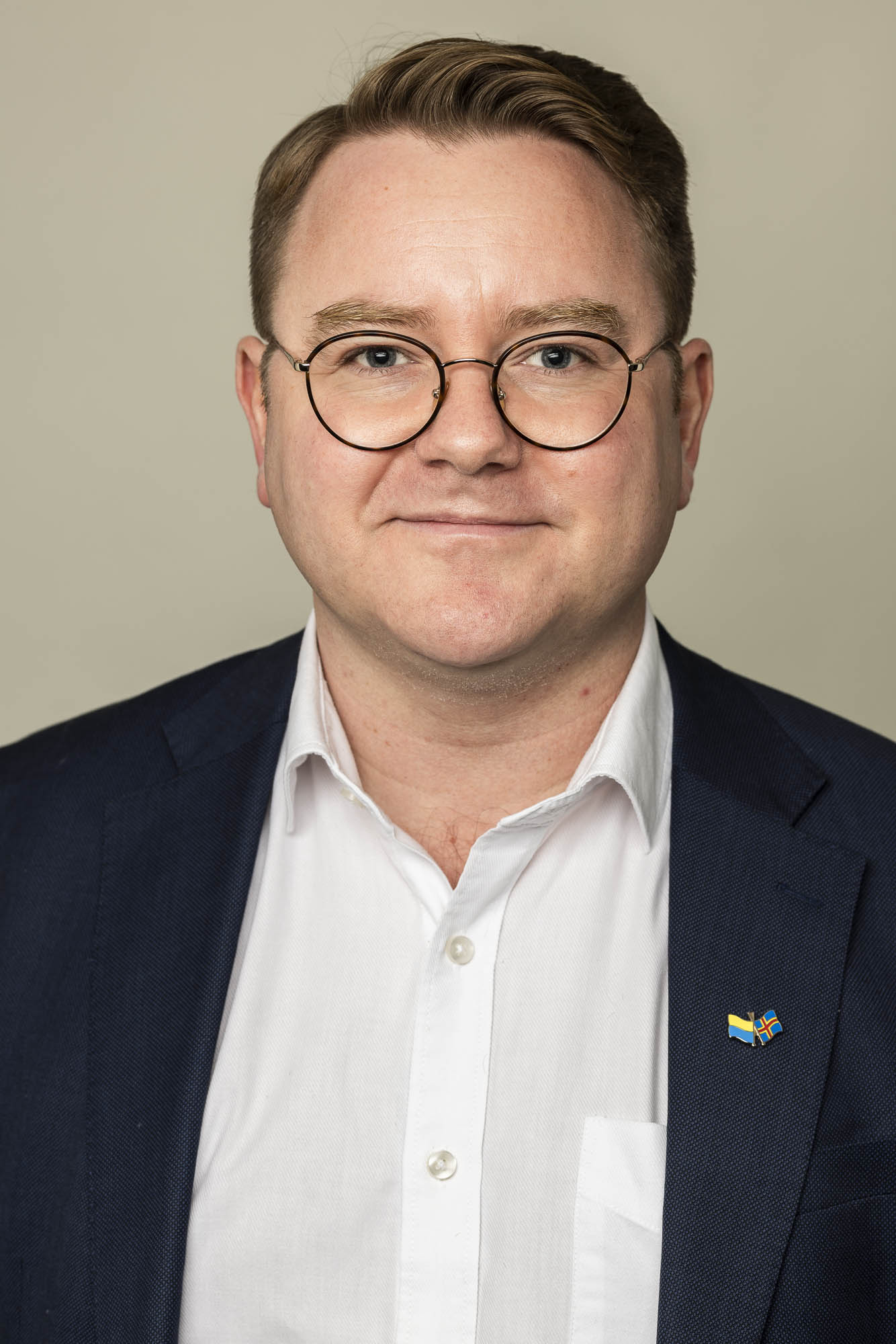

Member of the Åland Parliament
- Incumbent
- Assumed office 2019

President of the Baltic Sea Parliamentary Conference
- In office 2024–2025

Member of Mariehamn City Council
- Incumbent
- Assumed office 2019

Minister of Environment, Energy and Higher Education
- In office 2019–2022

Co-chair, Sustainable Initiative
- In office 2019–2025

Personal details
- Born: 3 August 1983 (age 42)
- Party: Sustainable Initiative
- Spouse: Heidi Kullberg
- Children: 2

Alfons Röblom, born 3 August 1983 in Mariehamn, is an actor, journalist, and politician on the Åland Islands, an autonomous and unilingually Swedish territory of Finland.

== Biography ==
Alfons Röblom was educated at the Theatre Academy of Finland and the University of Helsinki. As an actor he has performed in productions at, among others, Teater Tribunalen/Teater Galeasen, Viirus, the National Swedish Theatre in Helsinki, and Wasa Theatre.

Alfons Röblom was elected to the Åland Parliament – the Lagting – in the election held on 20 October 2019. Following the election, he was appointed Minister for Environmental, Energy, Planning, Construction, Housing, and Higher Education, a position he held until 12 October 2022 when the Sustainable Initiative left the government.

In the 2023 election, Röblom was re-elected to the Lagting.

He represents the Sustainable Initiative party and has served as one of the party's co-chair (comparable to party leader) since September 2019. In March 2025, Alfons Röblom announced that he would step down as co-chair.
