= Ålands Radio and TV =

Public radio and television broadcaster in Åland

- Type: Radio and television
- Country: Finland
- Availability: Åland; online
- Headquarters: Mariehamn
- Broadcast area: Åland
- Owner: Government of Åland
- Key people: Fredrik Sonck (CEO); Heidi Grandell-Sonck (editor-in-chief)
- Launch date: 1 May 1996; 30 years ago
- Official website: www.alandsradio.ax
- Language: Swedish

Ålands Radio and TV (ÅRTV) (Swedish: Ålands Radio och TV Ab) is a public broadcaster in Åland, an autonomous region of Finland. It provides radio, television, and podcasts in Swedish.

== History ==
The company was founded on 1 May 1996 as a public broadcaster owned by the Åland government. It took over broadcasting in Åland from Rundradion i Finland. Broadcasting expanded from a few hours a day to full-day broadcasting.

At the end of 2019, the broadcaster was expected to receive €2.5 million in tax funding in 2020.

ÅRTV switched to HDTV at the Smedsböle Radio Mast on 9 February 2021. From 31 March 2021, all standard-definition broadcasts ceased, requiring HD-compatible receivers.
