= Kerstin Alm =

Åland politician

Kerstin Alm (born 9 May 1949) is a politician of the autonomous Åland Islands. She served as Minister of Industry and Trade from 2003 to 2005.

== See also ==
- Government of Åland
