= Martin Isaksson =

Finnish politician (1921–2001)

Martink Isaksson

Finnish Ambassador to Iceland
- In office 1 October 1982 – 31 July 1985
- Succeeded by: Anders Huldén

Governor of Åland
- In office 1 July 1972 – 1 October 1982
- Preceded by: Tor Brenning
- Succeeded by: Henrik Gustavsson

Lantråd of Åland
- In office 28 March 1967 – 21 July 1972
- Preceded by: Hugo Johansson
- Succeeded by: Alarik Häggblom

Personal details
- Born: 20 June 1921
- Died: 16 December 2001 (aged 80)

Martin Isaksson (1921–2001) was a Finnish politician and diplomat from Åland. He served as Lantråd of Åland from 1967 to 1972, then as its governor from 1972 to 1982. He was later Finland's ambassador to Iceland from 1982 to 1985.
