= Ängskärsfjärden =

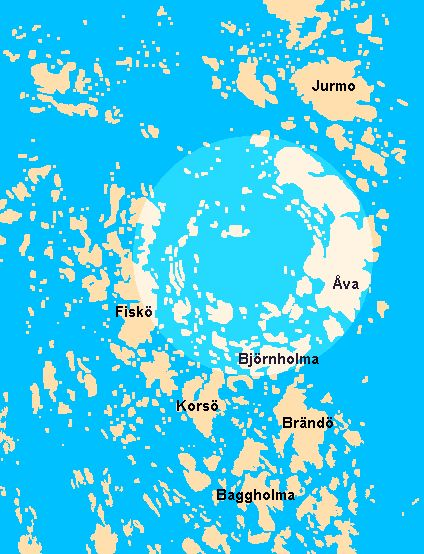
- Interactive map of Ängskärsfjärden
- Location: Brändö, Åland, Finland
- Coordinates: 60°27′52″N 21°01′03″E
- Type: Fjard
- Part of: Archipelago Sea

The Ängskärsfjärden is a fjard of the Archipelago Sea in Brändö, Åland, Finland. The islands around it, also known as the 'Åva ring', have a multi circular appearance, formed as a result of a diapir (intrusion of magma into the Earth's crust). A similar formation is Mossalafjärden, further to the southeast.
