= Harriet Lindeman =

Finnish politician

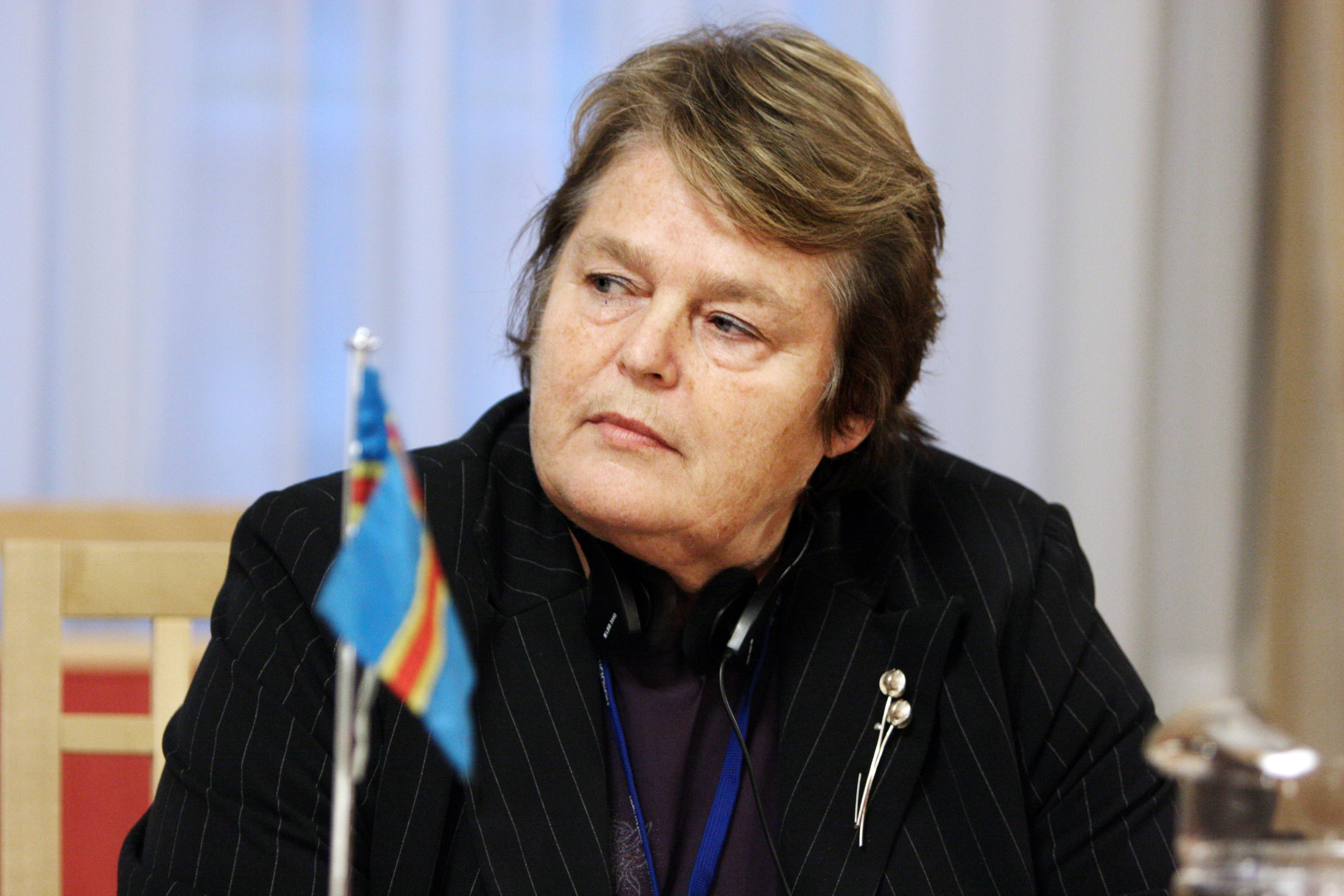
- Lindeman in Oslo in 2007

Minister of Social Affairs and Environment
- In office 2005–2007
- Preceded by: Gun-Mari Lindholm
- Succeeded by: Katrin Sjögren

Second Deputy Speaker. the Parliament of Åland
- In office 2003–2005

Minister of Social Affairs and Environment
- In office 1999–2001
- Preceded by: Gun Carlson
- Succeeded by: Sune Eriksson

Minister of Education and Culture
- In office 1995–1999
- Preceded by: Roger Nordlund
- Succeeded by: Gun Carlson

Deputy Premier
- In office 1991–1995
- Preceded by: May Flodin
- Succeeded by: Roger Nordlund

Minister of Social Affairs and Environment
- In office 1991–1995
- Preceded by: May Flodin
- Succeeded by: Gun Carlson

Personal details
- Born: 16 June 1946 (age 79)
- Party: Åland Conservatives
- Website: www.fs.ax

Harriet Lindeman (born 16 June 1946) is a politician in the Åland Islands, an autonomous and unilingually Swedish territory of Finland.

- Minister of Social Affairs and Environment 2005-2007
- Second Deputy Speaker of the Lagting (Åland parliament) 2003-2005
- Minister of Social Affairs and Environment 1999-2001
- Minister of Education and Culture 1995-1999
- Vice lantråd (Deputy Premier) 1991-1995
- Member of the Lagting (Åland parliament) 1987-1991

Lindeman, a nurse by profession, is one of the island group's most experienced politicians. She retired from national politics in 2007.
