= Britt Lundberg =

Finnish politician

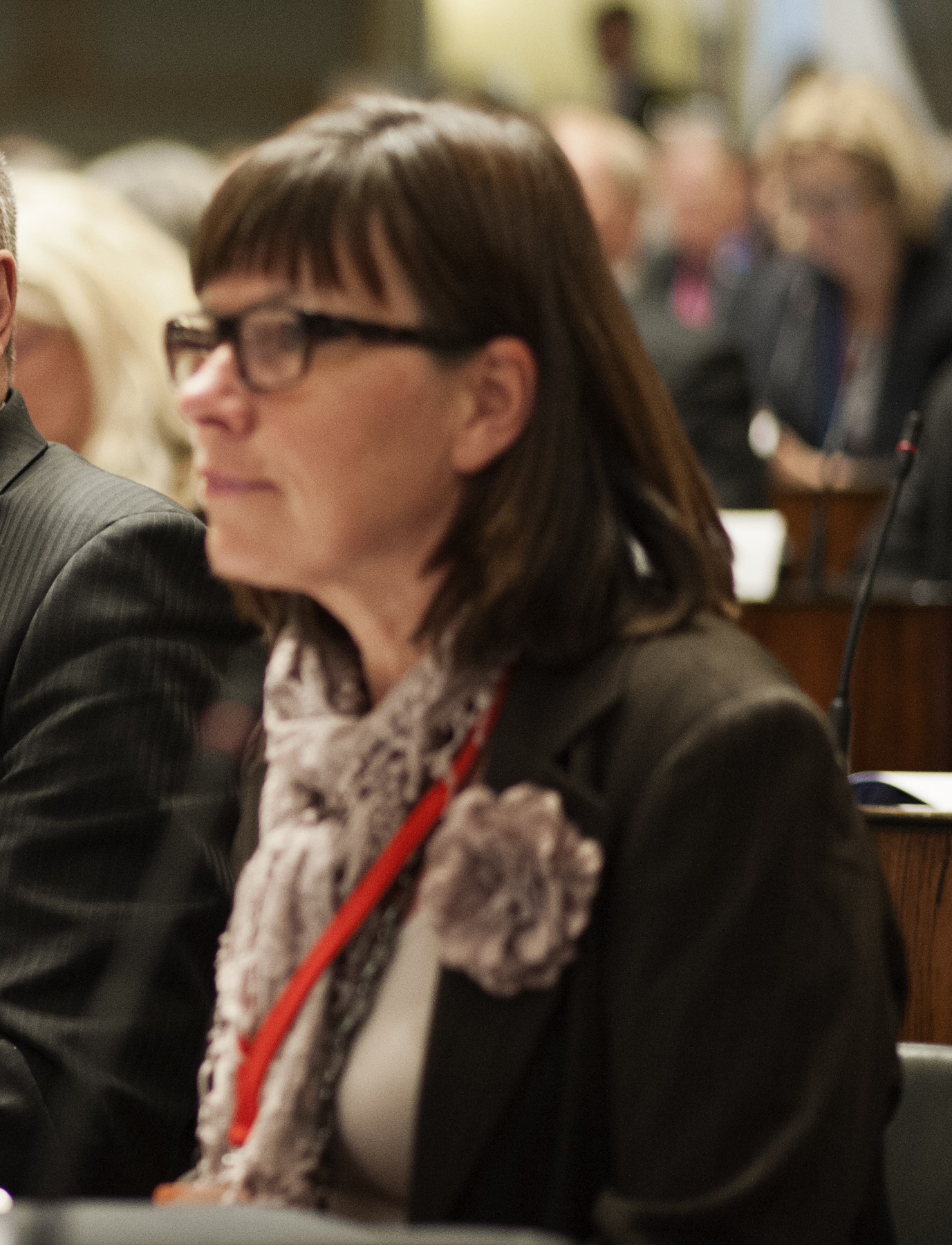

President of the Nordic Council
- In office 2017–2017
- Succeeded by: Michael Tetzschner

Speaker of the Parliament of Åland
- In office 2011–2015
- Preceded by: Roger Nordlund
- Succeeded by: Johan Ehn

Deputy Premier and Minister of Culture and Education
- In office 2007–2011
- Preceded by: Jörgen Strand, Camilla Gunell

Minister of administration, equality and EU affairs
- In office 2005–2007
- Succeeded by: Roger Eriksson

Personal details
- Born: 19 April 1963 (age 63)
- Party: Åland Centre
- Website: www.centern.ax

Britt Lundberg (born 19 April 1963) is a politician in the Åland Islands, an autonomous and unilingually Swedish territory of Finland. She served as President of the Nordic Council during the 2017 session. She was formerly Speaker of the Parliament of Åland 2011–2015, Deputy Premier and Minister of Culture and Education 2007–2011, Minister of administration, equality and EU affairs 2005–2007 and a Member of the lagting (Åland parliament) 1999–2004.
