= Danne Sundman =

Åland Islands politician (1973–2018)

Danne Sundman (6 December 1973 – 24 November 2018) was a politician from the Åland Islands, an autonomous and unilingually Swedish territory of Finland.

- Member of the Lagting (Åland parliament) 2001-
- Minister of administration, law affairs and information technology 1999-2001

In April 2008, Sundman sponsored a proposal to reset clocks in the Åland Islands from Finnish standard time (UTC +2) to Swedish time (UTC +1).
