= Sustainable Initiative =

Sustainable Initiative Hållbart Initiativ
- Chairperson: Alfons Röblom; Erica Scott
- Secretary: Pia Widén
- Founded: 2014 (initial); 17 June 2019 (as a political party)
- Ideology: Green politics
- European affiliation: European Green Party
- Nordic affiliation: Centre Group
- Colours: Blue; Red; Green
- Eduskunta (Åland Coalition): 0 / 1
- Lagtinget: 1 / 30

Website
- www.hallbartinitiativ.ax

The Sustainable Initiative (Swedish: Hållbart Initiativ, abbr. Hi) is a political party in Åland.

== History ==
Sustainable Initiative was officially formed as a political party in June 2019 ahead of that year's elections. Prior, it had been an unregistered political movement.

In the municipal election the party won in total of four seats: two in Mariehamn, one in Lemland and one in Hammarland.

It is a member party of the Centre Group of the Nordic Council.

== Election results ==
=== Parliament of Åland (Lagting) ===
Election	Votes	%	Seats	+/-	Government
2015	111	0.80	0 / 30	New	Extra-parliamentary
2019	1,187	8.33	2 / 30	▲2	Coalition
2023	720	5.13	1 / 30	▼1	Opposition

=== Parliament of Finland ===
Election	Votes	%	Seats	+/–	Government
2023	494	0.02	0 / 200	New	Extra-parliamentary
