= Ritva Sarin-Grufberg =

Politician in the Åland Islands

Ritva Sarin-Grufberg (born 17 May 1944) is a politician in the Åland Islands, an autonomous and unilingually Swedish territory of Finland.

- Mayor of Mariehamn 2003–2007
- Minister of industry and trade 2001–2003
- Member of the lagting (Åland parliament) 1999–2001
- Mayor of Mariehamn 1988–1999

She is married to Lennart Grufberg.
