= Roger Jansson =

Aland Islands politician

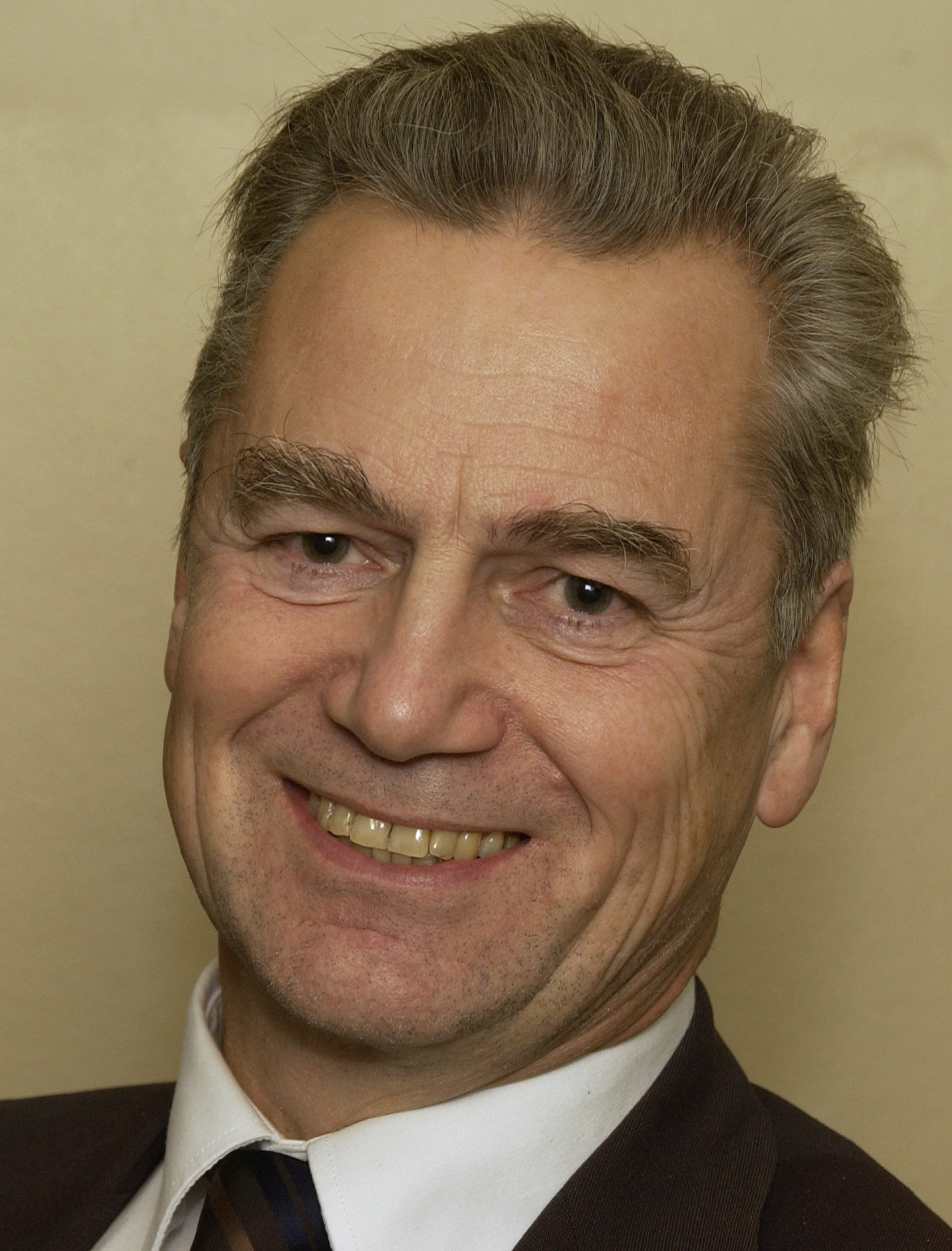

Premier of Åland
- In office 24 November 1995 – 3 December 1999
- Preceded by: Ragnar Erlandsson
- Succeeded by: Roger Nordlund

Minister of Industry and Trade
- In office 1999–2001

Member of Parliament of Åland
- Incumbent
- Assumed office 2007
- In office 2003–2003

Personal details
- Born: 9 August 1943 (age 82) Kimito, Finland
- Political party: Moderates of Åland

Roger Jansson (born 9 August 1943 in Kimito) is a politician in the Åland Islands, an autonomous and unilingually Swedish territory of Finland. He has studied in Åbo Akademi.

- Member of Ålands lagting (Åland parliament) 2007-
- Åland Member of the Finnish parliament 2003-2007
- Member of Ålands lagting (Åland parliament) 1979-2003
- Minister of industry and trade 1999-2001
- Lantråd (premier of the government of Åland) 1995-1999
- Speaker of Ålands lagting 1994-1995
- Second deputy speaker Ålands lagting (Åland parliament) 1983 and 1991–1993

Assembly seats
Preceded by Gunnar Jansson	Member of Finnish Parliament for Åland; 2003–2007	Succeeded by Elisabeth Nauclér
