= Camilla Gunell =

Finnish politician

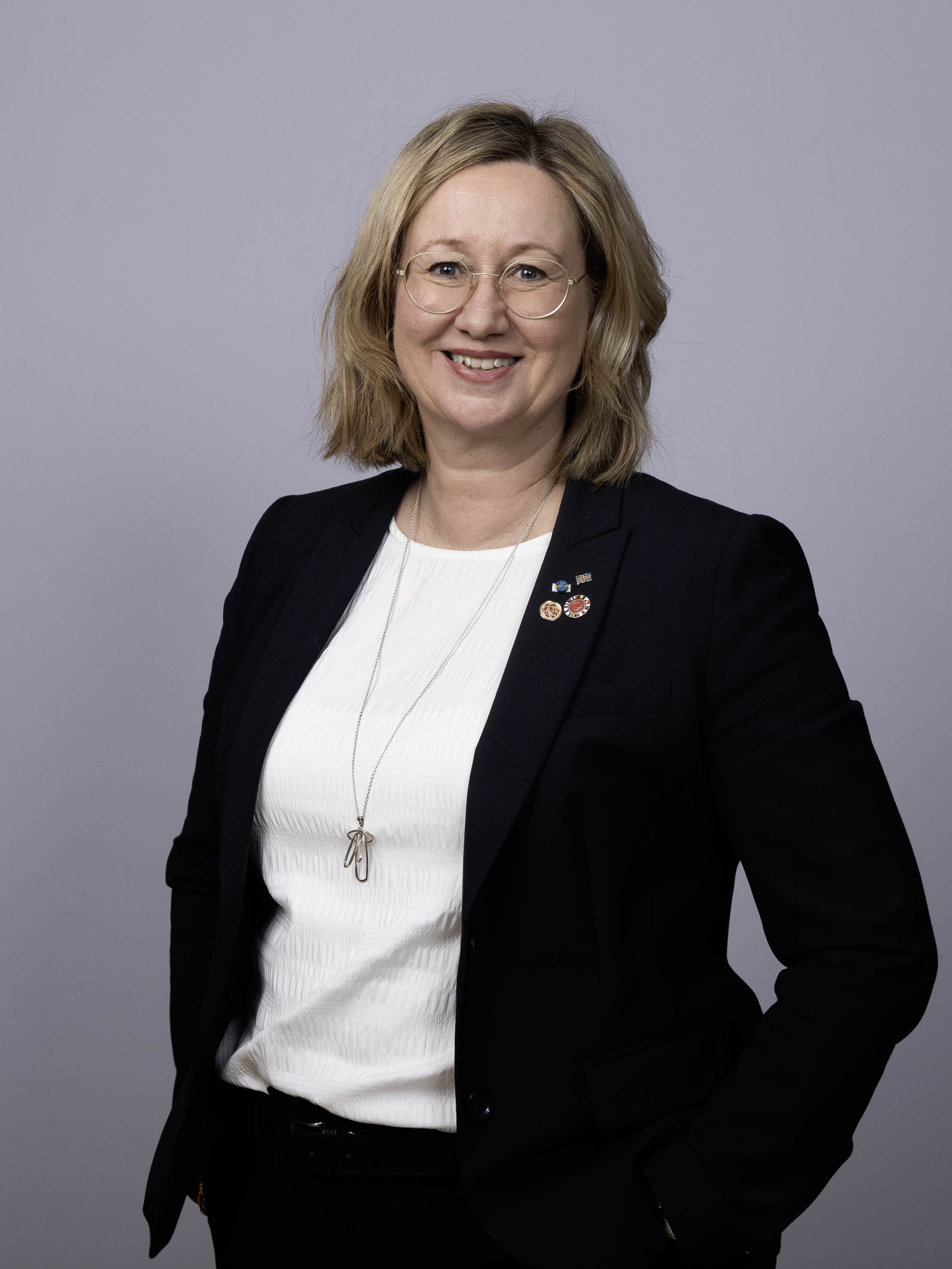

Premier of Åland
- In office 25 November 2011 – 25 November 2015
- Preceded by: Viveka Eriksson
- Succeeded by: Katrin Sjögren

Minister of Education and Culture
- In office 2005–2007
- Preceded by: Lars Selander
- Succeeded by: Britt Lundberg

Personal details
- Born: 7 September 1970 (age 55)
- Party: Åland Social Democrats
- Spouse: Michael Gunell
- Website: www.regeringen.ax

Camilla Gunell (born 7 September 1970) is a politician within the Åland Islands, an autonomous and unilingually Swedish territory of Finland, and the former Premier of the Government of Åland.

== Positions ==
=== Current ===
Minister for Infrastructure and Climate.

Leader of the Åland Social Democrats.

=== Past ===
- Member of the lagting (The Parliament of Åland) 2003–2027
- Minister for Education and Culture 2005–2007
- Member of the lagting (The Parliament of Åland) 2003–2005
- Government of Åland Premier of Åland Islands from 2011 to 2015
- Vice Premier of Åland Islands from 2015 to 2019
- Minister for Business and the Environment from 2015 to 2019

== Honors ==
- Order of the Polar Star (Sweden, 2022)
