= Olof Salmén =

Finnish politician

Olof Salmén (1927–28 May 2011) was a politician in Åland, an autonomous and Swedish-speaking territory of Finland.

- Member of the Lagting (Åland parliament) 2001-2003
- Vice Lantråd (deputy premier) and Minister for finance 1999-2001
- Member of the Lagting (Åland parliament)1988-1999
- President of the Nordic Council 1996-1997
- Member of government 1980-1987
- Member of the Lagting (Åland parliament) 1979, 1971–1975

Salmén was president of the Nordic Council 1996–1997.

== See also ==
- Government of Åland
