= Gun Carlson =

Finnish politician

Gun Carlson (born 17 August 1939) is a politician in Åland, an autonomous and unilingually Swedish territory of Finland.

- Member of the Lagting (Parliament of Åland) 2003-2011
- Minister of education and culture 1999-2003
- Minister of social affairs and environment 1995-1999
- Substitute member of government 1994-1995
