= Fanny Sundström =

Finnish politician (1883–1944)

Fanny Sundström (1883, Sund, Åland – 1944) was a teacher, farmer, and politician in Finland. After becoming a primary school teacher, she took an active part in the "Martha Movement" (sv. Marthaföreningen) and worked for social improvements.

The Martha Movement was established in 1899 with the founding of the bilingual (Swedish and Finnish) association Martha to advance women's access to public education throughout Finland, partially as a way to combat Russification. The Martha association was divided into two organizations in 1924, Finland's Swedish Martha Association (sv. Finlands svenska Marthaförbund) and Marttaliitto.

In 1922, Fanny Sundström became the first woman elected to the Parliament of Åland and remained the sole female member for some time. In 1929 she was elected to the municipal council. She remained politically active until her death.
