= Peter Lindbäck =

Åland politician (born 1955)

Governor of Åland
- In office 5 March 1999 – 1 April 2023
- Preceded by: Henrik Gustafsson
- Succeeded by: Marine Holm-Johansson
- President: Martti Ahtisaari; Tarja Halonen; Sauli Niinistö

Personal details
- Born: 14 June 1955 (age 71) Helsinki, Finland
- Education: University of Helsinki

Peter Lindbäck (born 14 June 1955, Helsinki) is an Ålandic politician. From 1999 to 2023 he served as the governor of Åland. Since 2023, he has been a member of the Parliament of Åland.

He studied at the University of Helsinki, from which he graduated in law in 1981.

Lindbäck was appointed governor of Åland on 5 March 1999, following the retirement of his predecessor, Henrik Gustafsson.

== See also ==
- Åland
- Government of Åland
- Provincial Governors of Finland
