= Olof Erland =

Finnish politician

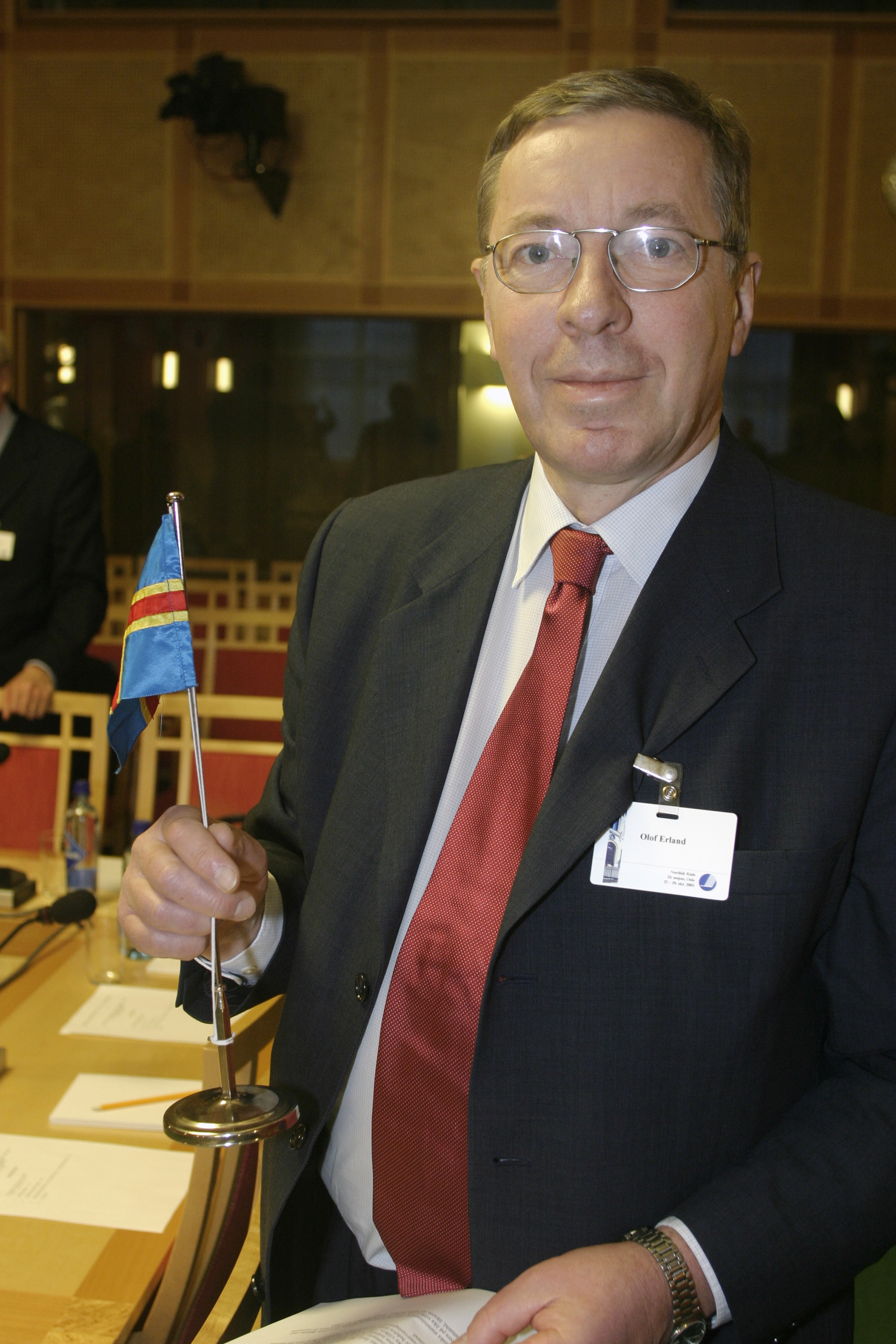
Erland in Oslo in 2003

Olof Erland (16 February 1944 - 23 May 2013) was a politician in the autonomous Åland Islands.

- Deputy premier (vice lantråd) minister for finance 2001–2003.
- Member of the lagting (Åland parliament) 1991–2011.

Married to Viveka Eriksson
