= Lantråd =

Head of government of Åland

Lantråd is the title of the head of government of the Åland Islands in Finland. The person holding the office leads its regional government.

The current Lantråd is Katrin Sjögren.

== List ==
List of premiers of the Åland Islands (1922–Present):

- Carl Björkman (1922–1938)
- Viktor Strandfält (1938–1955)
- Hugo Johansson (1955–1967)
- Martin Isaksson (1967–1972)
- Alarik Häggblom (1972–1979)
- Folke Woivalin (1979–1988)
- Sune Eriksson (1988–1991)
- Ragnar Erlandsson (1991–1995)
- Roger Jansson (1995–1999)
- Roger Nordlund (1999–2007)
- Viveka Eriksson (2007–2011)
- Camilla Gunell (2011–2015)
- Katrin Sjögren (2015–2019)
- Veronica Thörnroos (2019–2023)
- Katrin Sjögren (2023–present)

== See also ==
- Vice lantråd
- Government of Åland
- Parliament of Åland
