= Julius Sundblom =

Finnish editor and politician

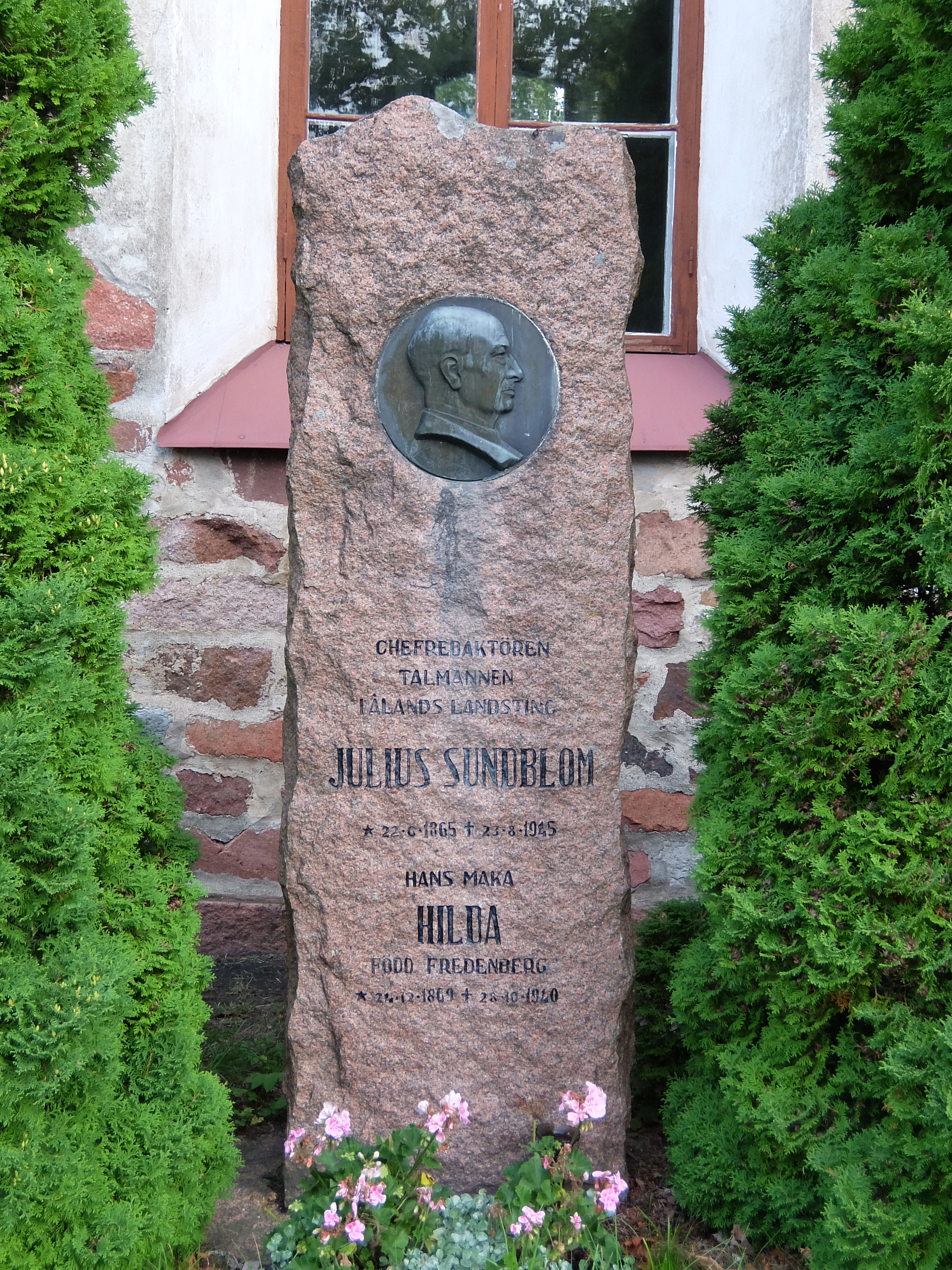
Grave of Julius Sundblom at Jomala churchyard

August Julius Sundblom (22 June 1865 – 23 August 1945) was an editor and politician in Åland, Finland.

Sundblom was born in Jomala, Åland. He founded Tidningen Åland in 1891, and was its editor-in-chief during 1891–1896 and 1921–1945. He was also editor-in-chief of Västra Nyland from 1895 until 1900, during which time he lived in Turku. He was a member of the Parliament of Finland from 1907 to 1919, representing the Swedish People's Party of Finland (SFP).

Following Finland's declaration of independence in 1917, Sundblom became one of the leading figures of the Åland movement. The movement's goal of returning Åland to Sweden resulted in the Åland Crisis. Before the resolution of the crisis, Sundblom, along with Carl Björkman, was arrested by Finnish police and spent a few days in prison, accused of treason. On 2 September 1920, he was given a prison sentence of a year and a half, but he was pardoned by President Ståhlberg in October 1920.

In 1922, Sundblom became the first Speaker of the Landstinget (later called Lagtinget), which had been instituted in accordance with the Finnish Autonomy Act of 1920 as part of the solution to the Åland Crisis.
