= Carl Björkman (politician) =

Premier of Åland

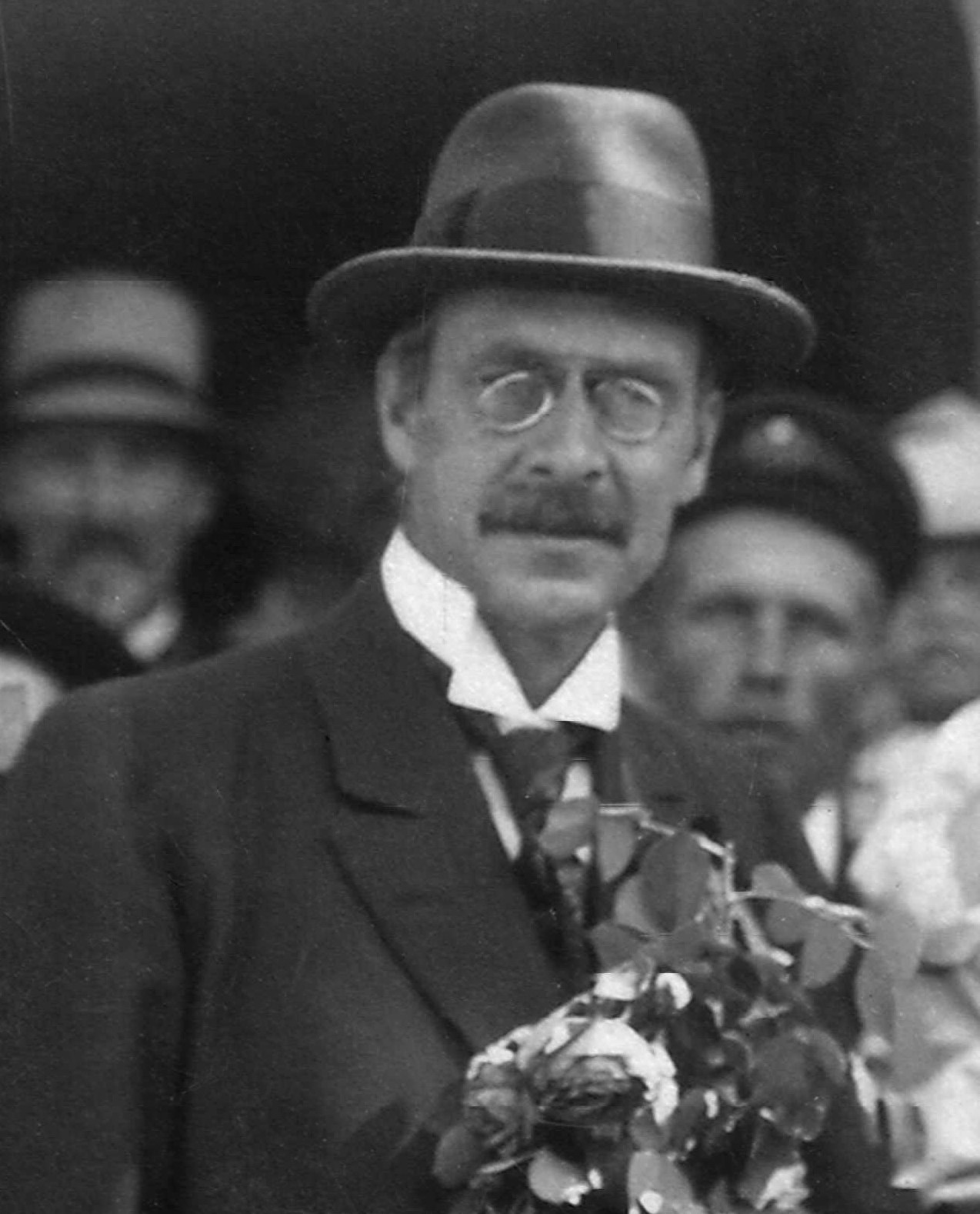
Carl Björkman in Mariehamn, the capital of Åland in the summer 1920.

Carl Björkman (15 February 1873 – 5 September 1948) was a politician in Åland, Finland. He was born in Turku and was the first premier of the Government of Åland.

Carl Björkman was along with Julius Sundblom the most prominent figure of the Åland movement for reunion with Sweden. Following Finland's declaration of independence in 1917, Björkman became one of the leading proponents of returning Åland to Sweden, which resulted in the Åland Crisis. Before the resolution of the crisis, Björkman, along with Julius Sundblom, was arrested by Finnish police and spent a few days in prison, accused of treason.

In 1922, Björkman became the first Premier (swe: Lantråd) of Landskapsstyrelsen (later called Landskapsregeringen), the executive branch of the Åland government, which had been instituted in accordance with the Finnish Autonomy Act of 1920 as part of the solution to the Åland Crisis. He would serve as lantråd until 1938.
