= List of ambassadors of Nazi Germany =

The German foreign office (Auswärtiges Amt (AA)) had a sizable network of diplomatic missions when Nazis came to power in 1933. While it was a deeply traditional and elitist organisation within the German civil service, it enthusiastically helped the Nazis prosecute an ambitious foreign policy.

Listed here are the ambassadors and other senior diplomats of the AA during the Third Reich, including those with the ranks of envoy (Gesandter), ambassador (Botschafter) consul and consul general as well as chargé d'affaires (Geschäftsträger)

Abyssinia

- Wilhelm Albrecht von Schoen (1932–1935)
- Hans Kirchholtes (1935–1936)

Afghanistan

- Kurt Max Paul Ziemke (1933–1936)
- Hans Pilger (1937–1945)

Albania

- Erich von Luckwald (1930–1936)
- Eberhard von Pannwitz (1936–1941)
- Martin Schliep (1941–1944)

Argentina

- Edmund Freiherr von Thermann (1933–1942)
- Erich Otto Meynen (1942–1944)

Austria

- Kurt Rieth (1931–1934)
- Franz von Papen (1934–1938)

Belgium

- Hugo Graf von und zu Lerchenfeld auf Köfering und Schönberg (1931–1934)
- Raban Adelmann von Adelmannsfelden (1934–1936)
- Herbert von Richthofen (1936–1938)
- Vicco von Bülow-Schwante (1938–1940)
- Werner von Bargen (1940–1943)

Protectorate of Bohemia and Moravia (Envoy)

- Werner Gerlach (1942–1943)
- Erich von Luckwald (1943–1945)

Bolivia

- Maximilian König (1932–1936)
- Ernst Wendler (1938–1942)

Brazil

- Arthur Schmidt-Elskop (1933–1937)
- Karl Ritter (1937–1938)
- Curt Max Prüfer (1939–1942)

Bulgaria

- Eugen Rümelin (1923–1939)
- Herbert von Richthofen (1939–1941)
- Adolf-Heinz Beckerle (1941–1944)

Chile

- Hans Kurd von Reiswitz und Kaderzin (1932–1934)
- Wilhelm Albrecht von Schoen (1936–1943)

China and the Reorganized National Government of the Republic of China

- Oskar Trautmann (1935–1938)
- Heinrich Georg Stahmer (1941–1943)
- Ernst Woermann (1943–1945)

Consul General in Canton

- Felix Alternburg (1934–1938)
- Franz Siebert (1939–1945)

Consul General in Hankou

- Enno Bracklo (1938–1947)

Consul in Jinan

- Franz Siebert (1925–1938)

Consul General in Nanjing

- Martin Fischer (1941–1944)

Consul in Qingdao

- Enno Bracklo (1932–1938)

Consul General in Shanghai

- Hermann Kriebel (1934–1937)
- Martin Fischer (1939–1945)
- Walther Dietrich Hoops (1945)

Consul General in Tienstin

- Wilhelm Stoller (1936–1941)
- Fritz Wiedemann (1941–1945)

Colombia

- Erdmann Karl Maria von Podewils-Dürniz (1928–1934)
- Werner von Hentig (1934–1936)
- Wolfgang Dittler (1936–1941)

Croatia, Independent State of

- Hermann Neubacher (1941–1941)
- Siegfried Kasche (1941–1945)

Cuba

- Hans Hermann Völckers (1937–1939)

Czechoslovakia

- Walter Koch (1920–1935)
- Ernst Eisenlohr (1935–1938)
- Andor Hencke (1938–1939)

Danzig, Free City of

- Edmund von Thermann [de](1925-1933)
- Otto von Radowitz(1933–1936)
- Erich von Luckwald(1936–1938)
- Martin von Janson (1938–1939)

Denmark

- Herbert Freiherr von Richthofen (1930–1936)
- Cécil von Renthe-Fink (1936–1942)
- Werner Best (1942–1945)

Ecuador

- Karl Pistor (1932–1936)
- Eugen Klee (1936–1942)

Egypt

- Eberhard von Stohrer (1926–1936)

Estonia

- Otto Reinebeck (1932–1936)
- Hans Frohwein (1936–1940)

Finland

- Hans Büsing (1932–1935)
- Wipert von Blücher (1935–1944)

France

- Roland Köster (1933–1936)
- Johannes von Welczeck (1936–1939)
- Otto Abetz (1940–1944) ambassador
- invested by Germany

Consul General in Algiers

- Erich Windels (1926–1934)
- Hermann Terdenge (1934–1937)
- Johannes Erhard Richter (1937–1939)

Consul General in Damascus

- Hans Kirchholtes (1934–1935)
- Ferdinand Sailer (1935–1939)

Consul in Hanoi

- Wilhelm Stoller (1928–1936)
- Neumann (1941–1942)

Consul General in Marseille

- Edgar von Spiegel von und zu Peckelsheim (1942–1944)

Greece

- Ernst Eisenlohr (1931–1936)
- Victor zu Erbach-Schönberg (1936–1941)

Guatemala

- Wilhelm von Kuhlmann (1924–1934)
- Erich Kraske (1934–1936)
- Otto Reinebeck (1937–1941)
- Christian Zinsser (1941)
- Franz Ferring (1941)

Holy See

- Diego von Bergen (1920–1943)
- Ernst von Weizsäcker (1943–1945)

Hungary

- Hans Georg von Mackensen (1933–1937)
- Otto von Erdmannsdorff (1937–1941)
- Dietrich von Jagow (1941–1944)
- Edmund Veesenmayer (1944–1945)

Iceland

- Werner Gerlach (1939–1940)

Iraq

- Fritz Grobba (1932–1939)

Ireland

- Georg Dehn-Schmidt (1923–1934)
- Wilhelm von Kuhlmann (1934–1937)
- Eduard Hempel (1937–1945)

Italy and the Italian Social Republic

- Ulrich von Hassell (1932–1938)
- Hans Georg von Mackensen (1938–1942)
- Rudolf Rahn (1942–1944)

Consul General in Genoa

- Hans Bernard (1941–1944)

Consul General in Milan

- Otto Bene (1937–1939)
- Walther Wüster (1940)
- Hans Bernard (1940–1941)

Consul General in Naples

- Walther Wüster (1943)

Consul General in Tripoli

- Gebhardt von Walther (1941–1943)

Japan

- Herbert von Dirksen (1933–1938)
- Willy Noebel (1938)
- Eugen Ott (1938–1942)
- Heinrich Georg Stahmer (1943–1945)

Consul General in Kobe

- Wagner (-1938)
- August Balser (1938–1945)

Consul General in Yokohama

- Menne (-1943)
- Heinrich Seelheim (1943–1945)

Latvia

- Georg Martius (1932–1934)
- Eckhard von Schack (1934–1938)
- Hans Ulrich von Kotze (1938–1941)

Lithuania

- Erich Zechlin (1933–1941)

Luxembourg

- Werner Freiherr von Ow-Wachendorf (1931–1934)
- Erdmann Graf von Podewilz-Dürniz (1934–1936)
- Otto von Radowitz (1936–1940)

Manchukuo

- Wilhelm Wagner

Consul General in Harbin

- August Ponschab

Consul General in Mukden

- Ernst Ramm

Consul General in Dairen

- Ernst Bischoff

Mexico

- Heinrich Rüdt von Collenberg (1933–1941)

Monaco

- Walter Hellenthal (1943–1944)

Netherlands

- Julius von Zech-Burkersroda (1928–1940)
- Otto Bene (1940–1945)

Consul General in Batavia

- Manfred Klaiber (1938)

Nicaragua

- Hugo Otto Danckers (1936–1941)

Norway

- Heinrich Rohland (1934–1936)
- Heinrich Sahm (1936–1939)
- Curt Bräuer (1939–1940)

Paraguay

- Fritz Max Weiss (1933–1934)
- Erhard Graf von Wedel (1934–1937)
- Hans Büsing (1937–1942)

Persia/Iran

- Wipert von Blücher (1931–1935)
- Johann Smend (1935–1939)
- Erwin Ettel (1939–1941)

Peru

- Heinrich Rohland (1924–1934)
- Ernst Schmitt (1934–1938)
- Eduard Willy Noebel (1938–1942)

Poland

- Hans-Adolf von Moltke (1931–1939)

Portugal

- Hans Freytag 1933–1934
- Oswald Baron von Hoyningen-Huene 1934–1945
- Gustav Adolph von Halem (1945)

Romania

- Friedrich Werner von der Schulenburg (1931–1934)
- Georg von Dehn-Schmidt (1934–1935)
- Wilhelm Fabricius (1936–1940)
- Manfred von Killinger (1941–1944)
- Carl August Clodius (1944)

Saudi Arabia

- Fritz Grobba (1939)

Slovak Republic

- Hans Bernard (1939–1940)
- Manfred von Killinger (1940)
- Hanns Ludin (1941–1945)

Spain

- Count Johannes von Welczeck (1925–1936)
- Hans_Hermann_Völckers (1933–1936)
- Wilhelm Faupel (1936–1937)
- Eberhard von Stohrer (1937–1942)
- Hans-Adolf von Moltke (1943)
- Andor Hencke (1943)
- Hans-Heinrich Dieckhoff (1943–1944)
- Sigismund von Bibra (1944–1945)

Consul General in Barcelona

- Hans Kroll (-1945)

Consul in Vigo

- Heribert Schwörbel (1943–1945)

Sweden

- Viktor zu Wied (1933–1943)
- Hans Thomsen (1943–1945)

Switzerland

- Freiherr von Schauenburg-Herrlisheim (-1920)
- Hans Borchers (1920–1933)
- Ernst von Weizsäcker (1933–1937)
- Otto Carl Köcher (1937–1945)

Tangier International Zone

- Kurt Rieth (1941–1944)

Thailand

- Erich August Karl Nord (1933–1935)
- Wilhelm Thomas (1936–1941)
- Ernst Wendler (1943–1945)

Turkey

- Rudolf Nadolny (1928–1933)
- Hans von Rosenberg (1933–1935)
- Friedrich von Keller (1935–1938)
- Franz von Papen (1939–1944)

Union of Socialist Soviet Republics

- Herbert von Dirksen (1928–1933)
- Rudolf Nadolny (1933–1934)
- Friedrich-Werner Graf von der Schulenburg (1934–1941)

Consul General in Batum

- Otto Bräutigam (1940–1941)

United Kingdom

- Leopold von Hoesch (1932–1936)
- Joachim von Ribbentrop (1936–1938)
- Herbert von Dirksen (1938–1939)

Consul General in Calcutta

- Werner von Ow-Wachendorf (1933–1936)
- Erdmann von Podewils-Dürnitz (1936–1939)

Consul General in Hong Kong

- Hermann Gipperich (1933–1939)

Consul General in Jerusalem

- Heinrich Wolff (1933–1935)
- Walter Döhle (1935–1939)

Consul General in Montreal and Ottawa (relocated in 1937)

- Ludwig Kempff (1922–1935)
- Henry Schafhausen (1935–1937)
- Erich Windels (1937–1939)

Consul General in Pretoria

- Friedrich Wilhelm von Keßler (1931–1933)
- Emil Wiehl (1933–1937)
- Rudolf Leitner (1937–1939)

Consul General in Singapore

- Walther Maenns (1931–1938)
- Adolf von Windecker (1938–1939)

Consul General in Sydney

- Rudolf Asmis (1932–1939)

Consul General in Wellington

- Walter Hellenthal (1936–1938)

United States

- Hans Luther (1933–1937)
- Hans-Heinrich Dieckhoff (1937–1938)
- Hans Thomsen (1938–1941)

Consul in Boston

- Herbert Scholz (1933–1941)

Consul in Chicago

- Georg Krause-Wichmann (1939–1941)

Consul General in Cleveland

- Hans Borchers (1926–1933)
- Karl Kapp (1936–1941)

Consul General in Los Angeles

- Georg Gyssling (1933–1941)

Consul in Manila

- Max Schulze (1933–1938)
- Gustav Sakowsky (1938–1941)
- Hans Lautenschlager (January–July 1941)

Consul General in New Orleans

- Ernst Wendler (1934–1936)
- Edgar von Spiegel von und zu Peckelsheim (1937–1941)

Consul General in New York

- Hans Borchers (1933–1941)

Consul General in Philadelphia

- Erich Windels (1939–1941)

Consul General in San Francisco

- Fritz Wiedemann (1939–1941)

Consul General in San Juan

- Henry Freese (-1941)

Consul General in St. Louis

- Herbert Diel (-1941)

Venezuela

- Franz von Tattenbach (1932–1937)
- Erwin Poensgen (1937–1941)

Yugoslavia

- Viktor von Heeren (1933–1941)

From Tobias C. Bringmann (2001), Handbuch der Diplomatie, 1815–1963: Auswärtige Missionschefs in Deutschland und Deutsche Missionschefs im Ausland von Metternich bis Adenauer (in German), Berlin: Walter de Gruyter, pp. 20 f., ISBN 9783110956849
