= Poensgen =

Poensgen is a surname. Notable people with the surname include:

- Ernst Poensgen (19 September 1871 in Düsseldorf – July 22, 1949, in Bern), German entrepreneur and patron of the city of Düsseldorf
- Erwin Poensgen (1882–1966), Ambassador of Nazi Germany to Venezuela from 1937 until 1941
- Isabel Pfeiffer-Poensgen (born April 25, 1954, in Aachen), German politician
- Katja Poensgen (born September 23, 1976), German former professional motorcycle racer
