= General Ramsay =

General Ramsay may refer to:

- Alan Ramsay (1895–1973), Australian Army major general
- Anders Edvard Ramsay (1799–1877), Finnish-born Russian Imperial Army General of the Finnish Guards' Rifle Battalion
- Angus Ramsay (born 1946), British Army major general
- Charles Ramsay (British Army officer, born 1936) (1936–2017), British Army major general
- Frank William Ramsay (1875–1954) British Army major general
- George Ramsay (English Army officer) (1652–1705), Scottish lieutenant general
- George D. Ramsay (1802–1882), U.S. Army brigadier general
- Henry Ramsay (Indian Army officer) (1816–1893), British Indian Army general
- Mark F. Ramsay (born c. 1958), U.S. Air Force lieutenant general
- George Ramsay, 9th Earl of Dalhousie (1770–1838), British Army general

== See also ==
- Ambrose Ramsey (died 1805), Hillsborough District Brigade brigadier general
