= Anthony Upton =

Anthony Upton may refer to:

- Anthony F. Upton (1929–2015), British professor of Nordic history
- Anthony Upton (judge) (1656–1718), English-born judge in Ireland
