= Wipert von Blücher =

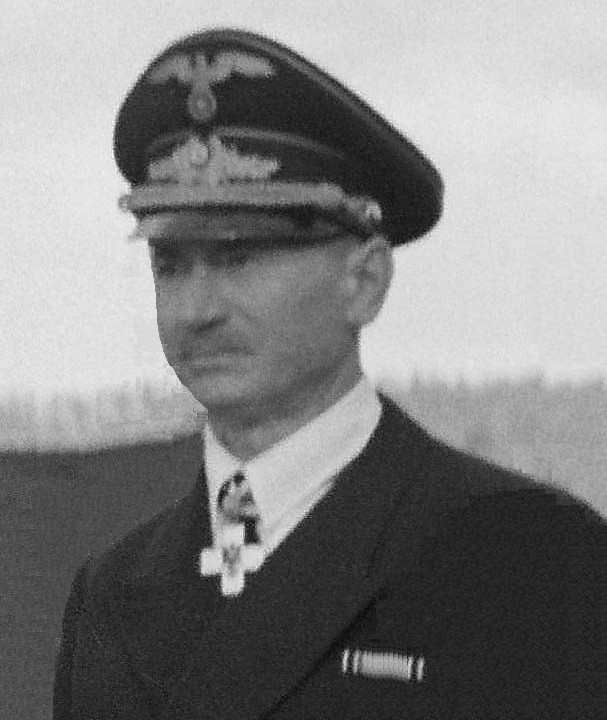
Wipert von Blücher in 1942

Wipert von Blücher (14 July 1883 – 18 January 1963) was a German diplomat and the German ambassador to Finland from 12 May 1935 to late 1944. He was a doctor of law by education.

== Education and career ==
Von Blücher was the son of the finance minister of the Grand Duchy of Mecklenburg-Schwerin, Ulrich-Vicco von Blücher. He studied law at the universities of Heidelberg, Berlin, Munich and Rostock and entered the German foreign service in 1911. Wipert von Blücher served in World War I and entered the Foreign Office of Germany in 1918. He served in diplomatic duties in Spanish Morocco, Stockholm, Buenos Aires and was appointed envoy to Tehran in 1931 and to Helsinki in 1935, a post he held until the severance of German-Finnish diplomatic relations in September 1944.

== Political stance and National Socialism ==
Politically, von Blücher was a national conservative, sceptical of both the Weimar Republic and Nazism. He was not a member of the Nazi Party but a professional diplomat who remained at his post out of a sense of duty despite persistent criticism from Nazi expatriate organisations. As envoy he emphasised continuity in German policy toward Finland and worked to preserve Finnish independence within the framework of cooperation with Germany. He kept his distance from the domestic far right and sought to limit Nazi influence in Finland, including in matters concerning the Jewish population.

During the war, German-Finnish relations developed into a military alliance that von Blücher saw as a model for the relationship between a great power and a small state. His close contacts with leading Finnish politicians, particularly foreign minister Rolf Witting and president Risto Ryti, were reflected in extensive and often divergent reporting to Berlin. This led to conflicts with foreign minister Joachim von Ribbentrop, especially after the Winter War.

== Writings ==
After the war von Blücher retired to Garmisch-Partenkirchen and devoted himself to writing memoirs. In his posthumous texts he formulated the often-cited image of Finland as "driftwood" in great-power politics. His papers are held in the Political Archive of the German Foreign Office, while copies of his diaries from Finland are in the National Archives of Finland in Helsinki.

In 1950 he published the book Gesandter zwischen Diktatur und Demokratie (Swedish translation: Ödesdigra år: diplomatiska minnen från Finland 1935–1944). The book describes von Blücher's role as mediator between a dictatorship and a democracy and is considered the foundation for the Driftwood theory, according to which Finland was drawn into its brotherhood in arms with Germany without active, strategic decisions. In the book, von Blücher describes his personal encounters with many of the leading figures of the era. The first meeting he recounts concerns Reza Pahlavi, the Shah of Persia, by whom von Blücher claims to have been disliked. He portrays in detail and with great respect his many meetings with Marshal Mannerheim and President Pehr Evind Svinhufvud. Other Finnish statesmen given detailed descriptions include presidents Kallio and Ryti, prime ministers Kivimäki, Cajander, Rangell, Linkomies and Hackzell, foreign ministers Holsti, Voionmaa, Erkko, Tanner, Witting, Ramsay and Carl Enckell, as well as defence minister Walden, minister Procopé and president Paasikivi (during 1935–44 mainly serving as ambassador and private citizen).

== Selected works ==
- Zeitenwende in Iran. Erlebnisse und Beobachtungen (Biberach 1949)
- Gesandter zwischen Diktatur und Demokratie. Erinnerungen aus den Jahren 1935–1944 (Wiesbaden 1951; Finnish and Swedish translations 1950)
- Deutschlands Weg nach Rapallo. Erinnerungen eines Mannes aus dem zweiten Gliede (Wiesbaden 1951)
- Wege und Irrwege der Diplomatie (Wiesbaden 1953; Finnish translation 1953)
- Am Rande der Weltgeschichte. Marokko – Schweden – Argentinien (Wiesbaden 1958)

== See also ==
- Waldemar Erfurth, German liaison officer at the Finnish headquarters in Mikkeli between 1941 and 1944
