= Domino theory =

Cold War–era geopolitical theory on the spread of communism

- Domino theory posits that a rise or fall in communist influence in a country will affect neighboring countries, and so on.
- Date: 1950s–1980s
- Location: Southeast Asia and globally (articulated in Washington, D.C.)
- Type: Geopolitical doctrine / Foreign policy
- Theme: Containment, anti-communism, and strategic alignment
- Cause: The rise of the Soviet Union and Communist China, and the expansion of communist movements in Asia
- Participants: Harry S. Truman, Dwight D. Eisenhower, John F. Kennedy, Lyndon B. Johnson, Richard Nixon
- Outcome: Served as the primary justification for US military intervention in Southeast Asia, most notably the Vietnam War

The domino theory is a geopolitical theory which posits that changes in the political structure of one country tend to spread to neighboring countries in a domino effect. It was prominent in the United States from the 1950s to the 1980s in the context of the Cold War, suggesting that if one country in a region came under the influence of communism, then the surrounding countries would follow. It was used by successive United States administrations during the Cold War as justification for American intervention around the world. US President Dwight D. Eisenhower described the theory during a news conference on April 7, 1954, when referring to communism in Indochina as follows:

Finally, you have broader considerations that might follow what you would call the "falling domino" principle. You have a row of dominoes set up, you knock over the first one, and what will happen to the last one is the certainty that it will go over very quickly. So you could have a beginning of a disintegration that would have the most profound influences.

Moreover, Eisenhower's deep belief in the domino theory in Asia heightened the "perceived costs for the United States of pursuing multilateralism" because of multifaceted events including the "1949 victory of the Chinese Communist Party, the June 1950 North Korean invasion, the 1954 Quemoy offshore island crisis, and the conflict in Indochina constituted a broad-based challenge not only for one or two countries, but for the entire Asian continent and Pacific." This connotes a strong magnetic force to give in to communist control, and aligns with the comment by General Douglas MacArthur that "victory is a strong magnet in the East."

== History ==
During 1945, the Soviet Union brought most of the countries of eastern Europe and Central Europe into its influence as part of the post-World War II new settlement, prompting Winston Churchill to declare in a speech in 1946 at Westminster College in Fulton, Missouri that:

From Stettin in the Baltic to Trieste in the Adriatic an "Iron Curtain" has descended across the Continent. Behind that line lie all the capitals of the ancient states of Central and Eastern Europe. Warsaw, Prague, Budapest, Belgrade, Bucharest and Sofia; all these famous cities and the populations around them lie in what I must call the Soviet sphere, and all are subject, in one form or another, not only to Soviet influence but to a very high and in some cases increasing measure of control from Moscow.

Following the Iran crisis of 1946, Harry S. Truman declared what became known as the Truman Doctrine in 1947, promising to contribute financial aid to the Greek government during its Civil War and to Turkey following World War II, in the hope that this would impede the advancement of Communism into Western Europe. Later that year, diplomat George Kennan wrote an article in Foreign Affairs magazine that became known as the "X Article", which first articulated the policy of containment, arguing that the further spread of Communism to countries outside a "buffer zone" around the USSR, even if it happened via democratic elections, was unacceptable and a threat to US national security. Kennan was also involved, along with others in the Truman administration, in creating the Marshall Plan, which also began in 1947, to give aid to the countries of Western Europe (along with Greece and Turkey), in large part with the hope of keeping them from falling under Soviet domination.

In 1949, a Communist-backed government, led by Mao Zedong, overthrew the earlier government of China (officially Mao's regime was called the People's Republic of China). The new government was established after the People's Liberation Army defeated the Nationalist Republican Government of China in the aftermath of the Chinese Civil War (1927-1949). Two Chinas were formed – mainland "Communist China" (People's Republic of China) and 'Nationalist China' Taiwan (Republic of China). The takeover by Communists of the world's most populous nation was seen in the West as a great strategic loss, prompting the popular question at the time, "Who lost China?" The United States subsequently ended diplomatic relations with the newly founded People's Republic of China in response to the communist takeover in 1949. The United States and communist China did not re-instate diplomatic relations again until under president Nixon's visit in 1972.

Korea had also partially fallen under Soviet domination at the end of World War II, split from the south of the 38th parallel where US forces subsequently moved into. By 1948, as a result of the Cold War between the Soviet Union and the US, Korea was split into two regions, with separate governments, each claiming to be the legitimate government of Korea, and neither side accepting the border as permanent. In 1950, fighting broke out between Communists and Republicans that soon involved troops from China (on the Communists' side), and the United States and 15 allied countries (on the Republicans' side). Though the Korean conflict has not officially ended, the Korean War ended in 1953 with an armistice that left Korea divided into two nations, North Korea and South Korea. Mao Zedong's decision to take on the US in the Korean War was a direct attempt to confront what the Communist Bloc viewed as the strongest anti-Communist power in the world, undertaken at a time when the Chinese Communist regime was still consolidating its own power after winning the Chinese Civil War.

The first figure to propose the domino theory was President Harry S. Truman in the 1940s, where he introduced the theory in order to "justify sending military aid to Greece and Turkey." However, the domino theory was popularized by President Dwight D. Eisenhower when he applied it to Indochina as the key to Southeast Asia during the First Indochina War. Moreover, the domino theory was utilized as one of the key arguments in the "Kennedy and Johnson administrations during the 1960s to justify increasing American military involvement in the Vietnam War."

In May 1954, the Viet Minh, a Communist and nationalist army, defeated French troops in the Battle of Dien Bien Phu and took control of what became North Vietnam. This caused the French to fully withdraw from the region then known as French Indochina, a process they had begun earlier. The regions were then divided into four independent countries (North Vietnam, South Vietnam, Cambodia, and Laos) after a deal and truce was brokered at the 1954 Geneva Conference to end the First Indochina War.

This would give them a geographical and economic strategic advantage, and it would make Japan, Taiwan, the Philippines, Australia, and New Zealand the front-line defensive states. The loss of regions traditionally within the vital regional trading area of countries like Japan would encourage the front-line countries to compromise politically with communism.

Eisenhower's domino theory of 1954 was a specific description of the situation and conditions within Southeast Asia at the time, and he did not suggest a generalized domino theory as others did afterward.

When John Kennedy came into office as president in 1961, communist-led movements, the Pathet Lao in Laos and the Viet Cong in South Vietnam, were gaining ground in those countries. The Kennedy administration feared that if either Laos or South Vietnam were to fall to communism, this would be the first in a string of dominoes. In September 1963, Kennedy was asked, "have you had any reason to doubt this so-called 'domino theory,' that if South Viet-Nam falls, the rest of southeast Asia will go behind it?" He replied, "No, I believe it. I believe it. I think that the struggle is close enough. China is so large, looms so high just beyond the frontiers, that if South Viet-Nam went, it would not only give them an improved geographic position for a guerrilla assault on Malaya, but would also give the impression that the wave of the future in southeast Asia was China and the Communists. So I believe it."

During the summer of 1963, Buddhists protested about the harsh treatment they were receiving under the Diem government of South Vietnam. Such actions of the South Vietnamese government made it difficult for the Kennedy administration's strong support for President Diem. President Kennedy was in a tenuous position, trying to contain Communism in Southeast Asia, but on the other hand, supporting an anti-Communist government that was not popular with its domestic citizens and was guilty of acts objectionable to the American public.

In February 1965, President Johnson made a strong statement of the domino theory: "If they take South Vietnam, they take Thailand, they take Indonesia, they take Burma, they come right on back to the Philippines."

=== Arguments in favor of the domino theory ===
The primary evidence for the domino theory is the spread of communist rule in three Southeast Asian countries in 1975, following the communist takeover of Vietnam: South Vietnam (by the Viet Cong), Laos (by the Pathet Lao), and Cambodia (by the Khmer Rouge). It can further be argued that before they finished taking Vietnam prior to the 1950s, the communist campaigns did not succeed in Southeast Asia. Note the Malayan Emergency, the Hukbalahap Rebellion in the Philippines, and the increasing involvement with Communists by Sukarno of Indonesia from the late 1950s until he was deposed in 1967. All of these were unsuccessful Communist attempts to take over Southeast Asian countries which stalled when communist forces were still focused in Vietnam, while Robert Grainger Thompson argued that US involvement even turned those within Communist nations toward the West.

Walt Whitman Rostow and the then Prime Minister of Singapore Lee Kuan Yew have argued that the US intervention in Indochina, by giving the nations of ASEAN time to consolidate and engage in economic growth, prevented a wider domino effect. Meeting with President Gerald Ford and Henry Kissinger in 1975, Lee Kuan Yew argued that "there is a tendency in the U.S. Congress not to want to export jobs. But we have to have the jobs if we are to stop Communism. We have done that, moving from simple to more complex skilled labor. If we stop this process, it will do more harm than you can every [sic] repair with aid. Don't cut off imports from Southeast Asia."

McGeorge Bundy argued that the prospects for a domino effect, though high in the 1950s and early 1960s, were weakened in 1965 when the Indonesian Communist Party was destroyed via death squads in the Indonesian genocide. However, proponents believe that the efforts during the containment (i.e., domino theory) period ultimately led to the demise of the Soviet Union and the end of the Cold War.

Linguist and political theorist Noam Chomsky wrote that he believes that the domino theory is roughly accurate, writing that communist and socialist movements became popular in poorer countries because they brought economic improvements to those countries in which they took power. For this reason, he wrote, the US put so much effort into suppressing so-called "people's movements" in Chile, Vietnam, Nicaragua, Laos, Grenada, El Salvador, Guatemala, etc. "The weaker and poorer a country is, the more dangerous it is as an example. If a tiny, poor country like Grenada can succeed in bringing about a better life for its people, some other place that has more resources will ask, 'Why not us?'" Chomsky refers to this as the "threat of a good example".

Some supporters of the domino theory note the history of communist governments supplying aid to communist revolutionaries in neighboring countries. For instance, China supplied the Viet Minh and later the North Vietnamese army with troops and supplies, while the Soviet Union supplied them with tanks and heavy weapons. The fact that the Pathet Lao and Khmer Rouge were both originally part of the Vietminh, not to mention Hanoi's support for both in conjunction with the Viet Cong, also give credence to the theory. The Soviet Union also heavily supplied Sukarno with military supplies and advisors from the time of the Guided Democracy in Indonesia, especially during and after the 1958 civil war in Sumatra.

=== Criticism of the domino theory ===
In a memorandum sent to CIA Director John McCone on 9 June 1964, the Board of National Estimates generally discounted the idea of the domino theory as applied to Vietnam:

We do not believe that the loss of South Vietnam and Laos would be followed by the rapid, successive communization of the other states of the Far East. Instead of a shock wave passing from one nation to the next, there would be a simultaneous, direct effect on all Far Eastern countries. With the possible exception of Cambodia, it is likely that no nation in the area would quickly succumb to communism as a result of the fall of Laos and South Vietnam. Furthermore, a continuation of the spread of communism in the area would not be inexorable and any spread which did occur would take time—time in which the total situation might change in any of a number of ways unfavorable to the Communist cause.

In the spring of 1995, despite having been a strong proponent of it during his time in office, former US Secretary of Defense Robert McNamara said he believed the domino theory to have been a mistake. "I think we were wrong. I do not believe that Vietnam was that important to the communists. I don't believe that its loss would have led – it didn't lead – to Communist control of Asia." Professor Tran Chung Ngoc, an overseas Vietnamese living in the US, said: "The US does not have any plausible reason to intervene in Vietnam, a small, poor, undeveloped country that does not have any ability to do anything that could harm America. Therefore, the US intervention in Vietnam regardless of public opinion and international law is "using power over justice", giving itself the right to intervene anywhere that America wants."

== Significance of the domino theory ==
The domino theory is significant because it underlines the importance of alliances, which may vary from rogue alliances to bilateral alliances. This implies that the domino theory is useful in evaluating a country's intent and purpose of forging an alliance with others, including a cluster of other countries within a particular region. While the intent and purpose may differ for every country, Victor Cha portrays the asymmetrical bilateral alliance between the United States and countries in East Asia as a strategic approach, where the United States is in control and power to either mobilize or stabilize its allies. This is supported by how the United States created asymmetrical bilateral alliances with the Republic of Korea, Republic of China and Japan "not just to contain but also constrain potential 'rogue alliances' from engaging in adventurist behavior that might it into larger military contingencies in the region or that could trigger a domino effect, with Asian countries falling to communism." Since the United States struggled with the challenge of "rogue alliances and the threat of falling dominoes combined to produce a dreaded entrapment scenario for the United States," the domino theory further underscores the importance of bilateral alliances in international relations. This is evident in how the domino theory provided the United States with a coalition approach, where it "fashioned a series of deep, tight bilateral alliances" with Asian countries including Taiwan, South Korea, and Japan to "control their ability to use force and to foster material and political dependency on the United States." Hence, this indicates that the domino theory assists in observing the effect of forged alliances as a stepping stone or stumbling block within international relations. This underscores the correlation between domino theory and path dependency, where a retrospective collapse of one country falling to communism may not only have adverse effects to other countries but more importantly, on one's decision-making scope and competence in overcoming present and future challenges. Therefore, the domino theory is indubitably a significant theory which deals with the close relationship between micro-cause and macro-consequence, where it suggests such macro-consequences may result in long-term repercussions.

== Applications to communism outside Southeast Asia ==
Michael Lind has argued that though the domino theory failed regionally, there was a global wave, as communist or socialist regimes came to power in Benin, Ethiopia, Guinea-Bissau, Madagascar, Cape Verde, Mozambique, Angola, Afghanistan, Grenada, and Nicaragua during the 1970s. The global interpretation of the domino effect relies heavily upon the "prestige" interpretation of the theory, meaning that the success of Communist revolutions in some countries, though it did not provide material support to revolutionary forces in other countries, did contribute morale and rhetorical support.

In this vein, Argentine revolutionary Che Guevara wrote an essay, the "Message to the Tricontinental", in 1967, calling for "two, three ... many Vietnams" across the world. Historian Max Boot wrote, "In the late 1970s, America's enemies seized power in countries from Mozambique to Iran to Nicaragua. American hostages were seized aboard the SS Mayaguez (off Cambodia) and in Tehran. The Soviet Army invaded Afghanistan. There is no obvious connection with the Vietnam War, but there is little doubt that the defeat of a superpower encouraged our enemies to undertake acts of aggression that they might otherwise have shied away from."

In addition, this theory can be further bolstered by the rise in terrorist incidents by left-wing terrorist groups in Western Europe, funded in part by Communist governments, between the 1960s and 1980s. In Italy, this includes the kidnapping and assassination of former Italian Prime Minister Aldo Moro, and the kidnapping of former US Brigadier General James L. Dozier, by the Red Brigades.

In West Germany, this includes the terrorist actions of the Red Army Faction. In the far east the Japanese Red Army carried out similar acts. All four, as well as others, worked with various Arab and Palestinian terrorists, which like the red brigades were backed by the Soviet Bloc.

In the 1977 Frost/Nixon interviews, Richard Nixon defended the United States' destabilization of the Salvador Allende regime in Chile on domino theory grounds. Borrowing a metaphor he had heard, he stated that a Communist Chile and Cuba would create a "red sandwich" that could entrap Latin America between them. In the 1980s, the domino theory was used again to justify the Reagan administration's interventions in Central America and the Caribbean region.

In his memoirs, former Rhodesian Prime Minister Ian Smith described the successive rise of authoritarian left-wing governments in Sub-Saharan Africa during decolonization as "the communists' domino tactic". The establishment of pro-communist governments in Tanzania (1961–1964) and Zambia (1964) and explicitly Marxist–Leninist governments in Angola (1975), Mozambique (1975), and eventually Rhodesia itself (in 1980) are cited by Smith as evidence of "the insidious encroachment of Soviet imperialism down the continent".

== Other applications ==
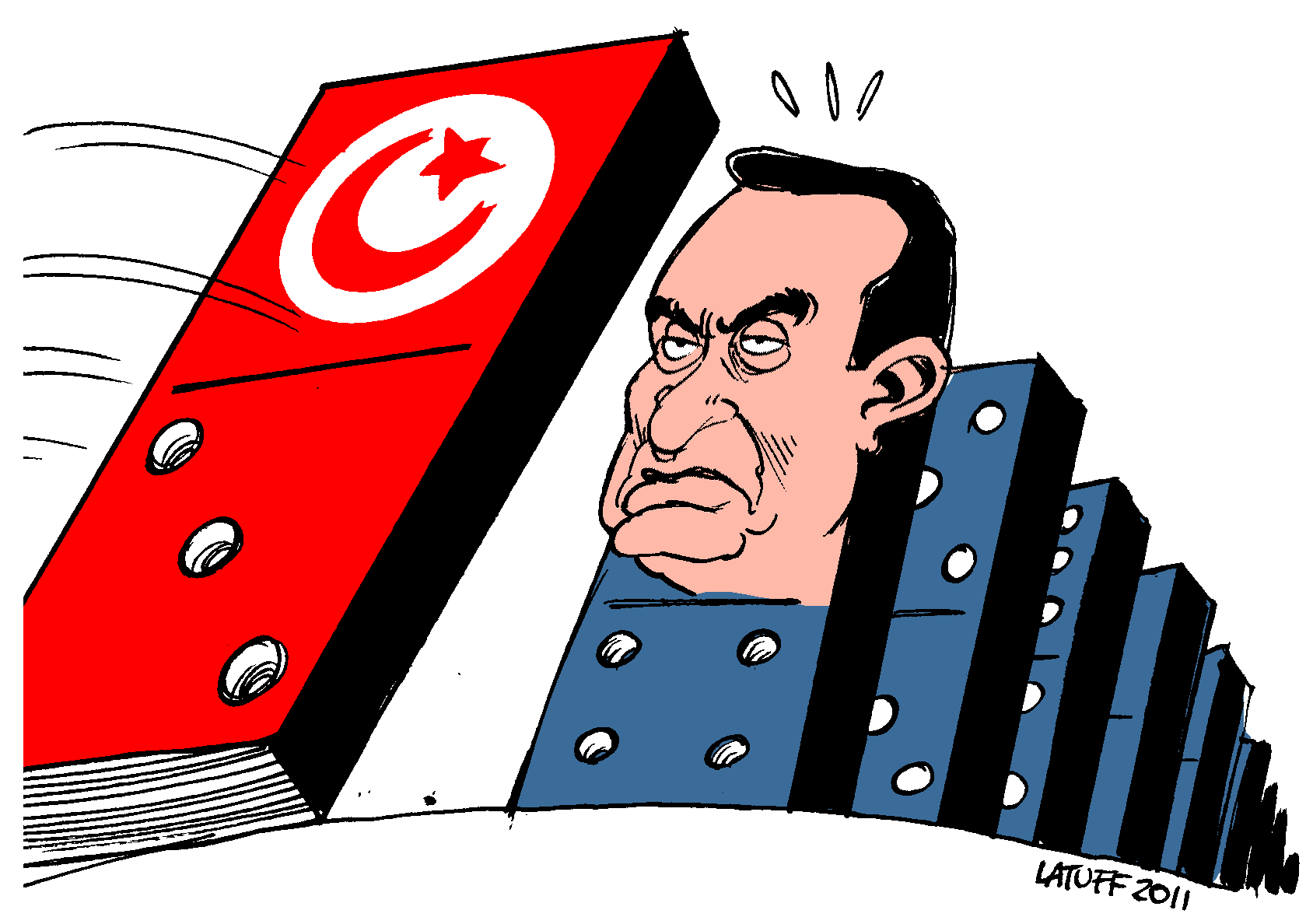
2011 political cartoon by Carlos Latuff applying domino theory imagery to the Arab Spring

Some foreign-policy analysts in the United States have referred to the potential spread both of Islamic theocracy and of liberal democracy in the Middle East as two different possibilities for a domino-theory scenario. During the Iran–Iraq War of 1980 to 1988 the United States and other western nations supported Ba'athist Iraq, fearing the spread of Iran's radical theocracy throughout the region. In the 2003 invasion of Iraq, some neoconservatives argued that when a democratic government is implemented, it would then help spread democracy and liberalism across the Middle East. This has been referred to as a "reverse domino theory", or a "democratic domino theory", so called because its effects are considered positive, not negative, by Western democratic states.

Russian analysis of a perceived pattern of pro-democratic movements in the post-Soviet era resulted in Vladimir Putin's "domino theory of colour revolutions, reiterated by other siloviki and found in military and national security doctrines".

Some views of successive Russian military interventions – in Georgia in 2008, in Kazakhstan (2022), and in Ukraine (2014 onward), for example – postulate a domino theory whereby Putin might expand Russian influence in eastern and central Europe.

== See also ==
- Cold War
- Containment
- Export of revolution
- Proletarian internationalism
- Quagmire theory
- Red Scare
- Revolutionary wave
- Slippery slope
- Truman Doctrine
- World revolution
