= Heinrich Karl Fricke =

German spy and consul in Spain (1924–1945)

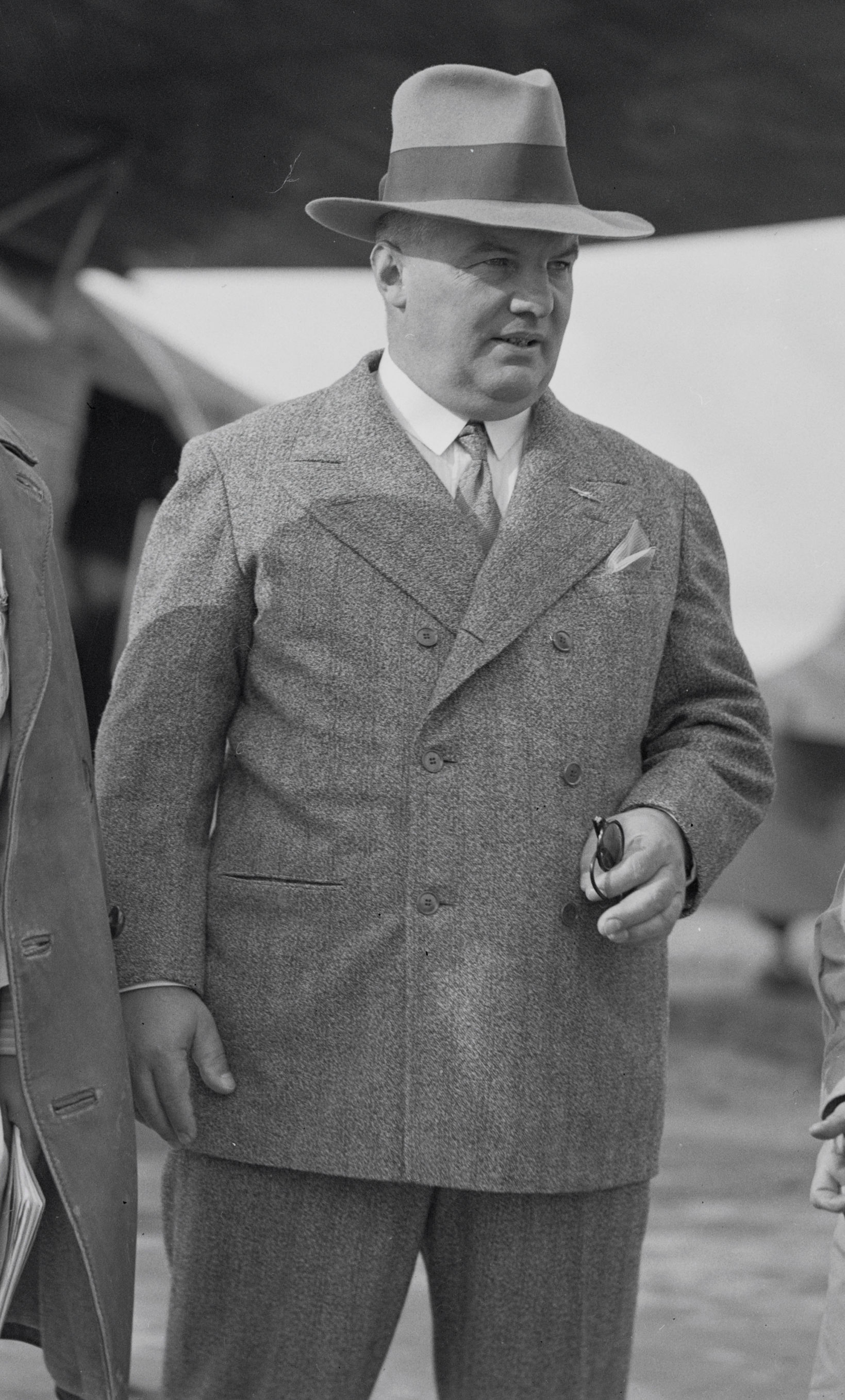
- Heinrich Karl Fricke in 1930, at the Los Alcázares Air Base.
- Born: May 1884; Germany
- Died: 21 October 1945 (aged 61); Cartagena, Spain
- Cause of death: Suicide
- Resting place: Our Lady of the Remedies Cemetery
- Citizenship: German
- Occupations: Diplomat, businessperson, and spy
- Political party: Nazi Party
- Awards: Order of Beneficence (1936); Imperial Order of the Yoke and Arrows (1941)

Heinrich Karl Fricke (Germany, May 1884–Cartagena, Spain, 21 October 1945), sometimes referred to by the Spanish form Enrique Carlos Fricke, was a German diplomat, businessperson, and spy who served as German consul in Cartagena from 1924 until shortly before his death.

He was enrolled in the armed forces of the German Empire, when he was caught and imprisoned in Cartagena as a result of a foiled infiltration mission during the First World War. He had settled in that Spanish city during the interwar period, and his business and social reputation provided him with a series of connections that facilitated his appointment as consular agent. He would later take advantage of this position to carry out military intelligence activities for Nazi Germany during the Spanish Civil War and the Second World War. At the same time, he favored the creation of an educational institution—the German School of Cartagena—which, however, did not last after his death. He died in 1945 as a result of grief for the death of his only son during the outbreak of war in Europe.

== Biography ==
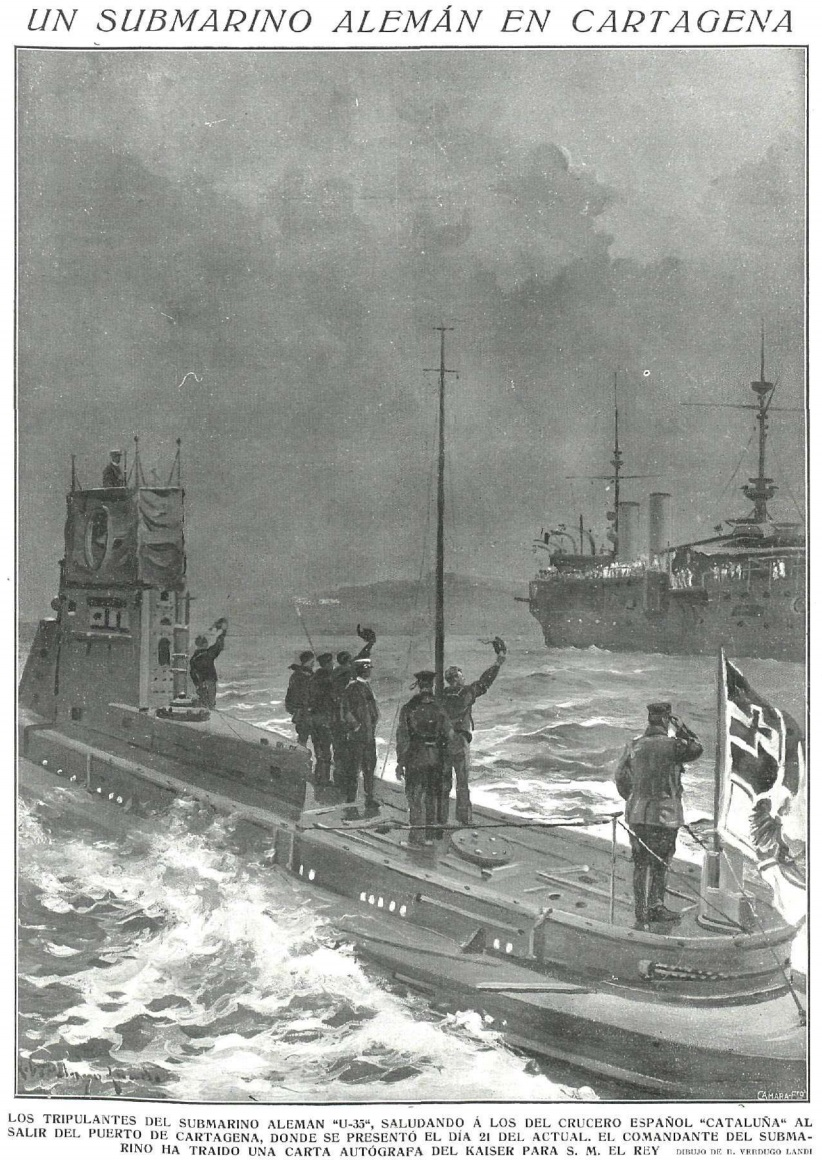
The crew of German submarine U-35 greeting the crew of the Spanish armored cruiser Cataluña as they leave the port of Cartagena. (La Esfera, 1 July 1916)

=== The First World War ===
Although Heinrich Karl Fricke is known to have been born in Germany in May 1884, further details about his early years are unknown. During the First World War, he was serving in the Imperial German Navy, with the rank of lieutenant, when he was entrusted with a confidential mission. He was sent to Spain, a country that had declared its neutrality in the conflict. According to Franco Fernández (2005), (Note: Although all sources agree that, upon his arrival in Spain, Heinrich Karl Fricke was a member of the German intelligence apparatus during the First World War, there is disagreement as to what his mission was and the dates on which he was attempting to carry it out. Apart from what Franco Fernández writes, works such as Riess's (2016) argue that Fricke was deployed to the Iberian Peninsula in 1917 at the request of Eberhard von Stohrer, secretary of the German Embassy in Madrid and organizer of espionage activities in Spain during the war. His mission would have been to make use of his US passport to travel to Argentina and, while there, sabotage the trade of the Allies, but the operation was foiled thanks to follow-up by British intelligence, which resulted in Fricke getting arrested and von Stohrer expelled from Spain. Bisher's version (2016) agrees with Riess's on the premise of Fricke being en route to Argentina, specifying that it was in February 1917 when he arrived in Cartagena aboard the U-35 and adding that he had "several cases of explosives and clockwork fuses" when he was captured. Lastly, Maestro López (2015) also argues that Fricke was arrested in February 1917, but adds that it was when he was trying to retrieve a large quantity of explosives and documents tied to a buoy that the U-35 had abandoned for him near Cape Tiñoso.) he was following the orders of Admiral Wilhelm Canaris when he boarded the submarine SM U-35, commanded by Captain Lothar von Arnauld de la Perière, and headed for the port of Cartagena with the excuse of delivering a letter from Kaiser Wilhelm II to King Alfonso XIII.

On 21 June 1916, the German submersible docked in Cartagena while the real purpose of the visitors was being completed, that is, the landing of its spy Fricke on the nearby beach of La Algameca. Fricke carried a large sum of money in pesetas and documentation identifying him as Henry Wood or Harry Wood, a US citizen from Boston. However, he was seen by some carabineros who intercepted him after a brief chase. He unsuccessfully attempted to bribe the Spanish security agents, who took him to the Cartagena Naval Base. The authorities resorted to the British consul to interrogate the detainee, whose complete command of the English language and acting as a simpleton did not completely dispel suspicions about his status as a spy. Nonetheless, this did prevent the consul from making a formal accusation, and thus he only requested that the prisoner remain under surveillance at the naval base until the war had ended.

Confined within the perimeter of the Naval Base, Karl Fricke soon had the opportunity to make use of his flattering character and his skills in the mercantile, military, and technological fields to gain the confidence of the lower and intermediate commands in the garrison. This allowed him to obtain contacts within smuggling circles, become familiar with the points of the Cartagena coast used by smugglers, and discreetly establish communication with German spies. Under his ruse of acting as a US national, he attracted the attention of politician Ramón de Navia-Osorio y Castropol and convinced him to mediate for his release. He was then granted this release on the condition that he would reside in Cartagena while hostilities continued in Europe. Fricke's superiors took advantage of this requirement and commissioned him to create a network of collaborators with which to supply the ships of the Imperial Navy, in violation of Spanish neutrality. Historians such as Luis Miguel Pérez Adán have considered Fricke as being ultimately responsible, starting in 1917, of a scheme that, in addition to facilitating the clandestine refueling of ships loyal to the Central Powers, sponsored military actions of their submarines at the harbor entrance against British ships, which caused numerous sinkings and diplomatic protests from this country.

=== Final years of the Bourbon Restoration ===
The signing of the Armistice of Compiègne in 1918 gave Fricke the opportunity to shed his fictitious identity and become fully integrated into the social life of Cartagena, where he officially settled from then on. He undertook a modest import and export business, the beginnings of which were based on the commercial introduction of radio sets in Spain and tools for the Naval Base workshops, followed later by the wholesale of oranges to Germany and other operations that included gas masks or drugs. By exploiting his entrepreneurial success during the 1920s, he infiltrated the upper middle-class circles of Cartagena society and rubbed shoulders with the intelligentsia of the cultural institution Ateneo. He gained recognition as a cultural philanthropist by contributing financially to its activities. It was around this time that he became friends with public figures of diverse profiles and ideologies, such as the monarchist man of letters and soldier Óscar Nevado de Bouza, Republican physicians Casimiro Bonmatí Azorín and Antonio Ros Sáez, or his fellow countryman, archaeologist Adolf Schulten.

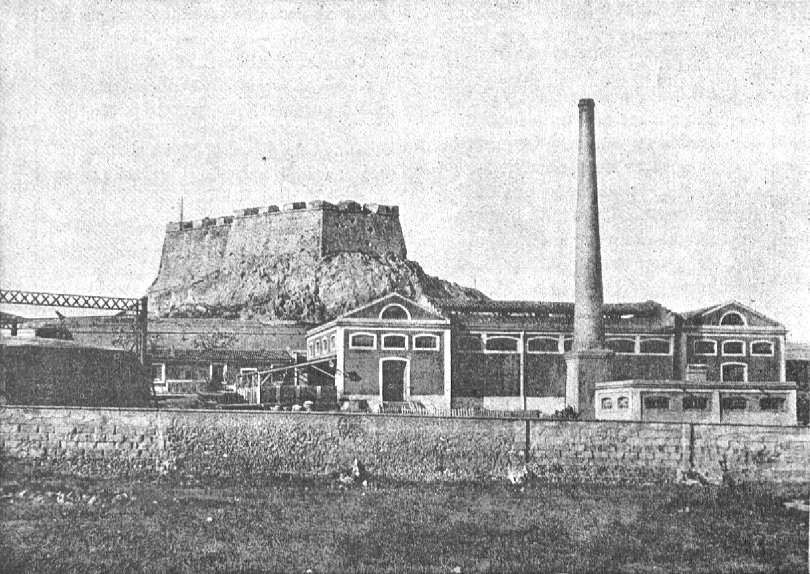
The Gas Factory of Cartagena, on a photoengraving from 1890.

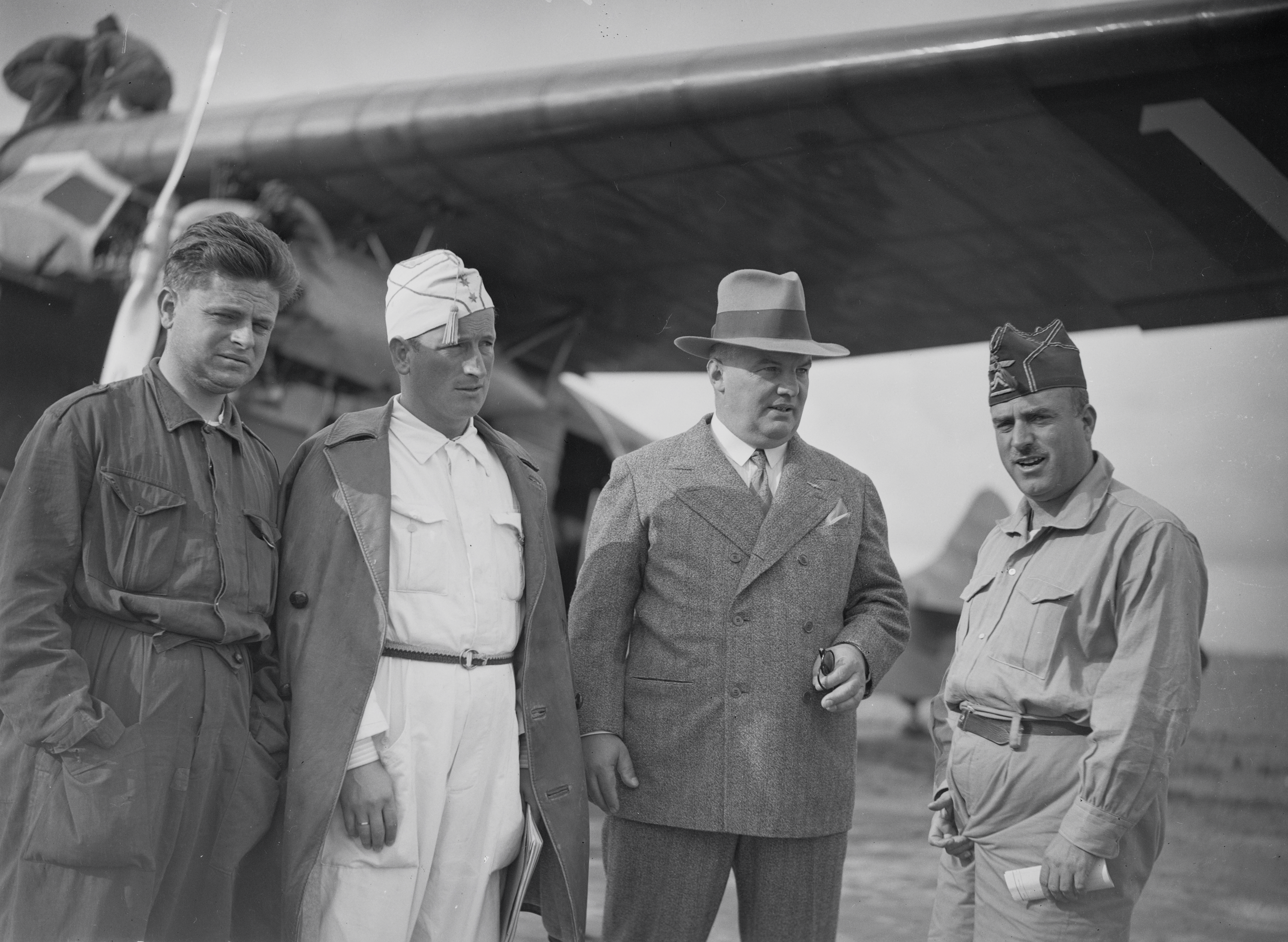
Fricke, third from the left, welcoming some German pilots at the Los Alcázares Air Base in 1930.

In that context, Karl Fricke achieved a preeminent position among the German community in the city. Thus, in 1924 he was appointed to serve as their diplomatic representative in the office of consul. This appointment further boosted his popularity and influence, to the point that several important companies, such as the Gas Factory, required his services as manager. The culmination of his rise to prominence took place at the end of the decade, when he married María Luisa Oliva Gutiérrez, heiress of a wealthy mill owner from Lorca. The couple settled in the mansion she owned at number 33, Muralla del Mar Street, (Note: This was a house in the eclectic-Art Nouveau style that had been planned for the Teulón Viso family in 1900 by architect Francisco de Paula Oliver Rolandi. It was located in an area where other foreign citizens and diplomats resided, and its layout allowed the first floor to be devoted to Fricke's professional and consular affairs while María Oliva retained the remaining two floors to use them as the couple's private residence. The building still exists, even though it was partially demolished while the original façade was left in place. However, as of 2009 this façade has also been replaced, according to Rodríguez Martín (2016), due to the construction of a new building superimposed over the previous one.) and their union was completed with the birth of their only son, Carlos (or Karl).

=== The Second Republic and the rise of Hitler ===
The Great Depression, which began in 1929, had major economic repercussions in Spain and, above all, in Germany. Thus, the decline in German foreign trade adversely affected Fricke's consulate activity, which was reduced to a minimum during the period in which the proclamation of the Second Republic was taking place in Spain. Despite everything and feeling determined to take advantage of the impulse that the new regime had provided to secular education, Fricke founded the German School of Cartagena in 1931 in the building owned by his wife in Muralla del Mar Street. The following year, he financed the Popular University of Cartagena founded by Carmen Conde and Antonio Oliver. From the beginning, the German School was patronized by the Cartagena middle class, eager for their children to obtain the elite education that would be imparted at the center and to share classrooms with the offspring of German expatriates.

In 1933, the Nazi rise to power in Germany triggered a purge and replacement of the national diplomatic corps. Initially, Karl Fricke was among those who would be potentially affected by this process. Pressure exerted by a large group of German businesspeople prevented him from being replaced. His confirmation as consul drove Fricke to offer his loyalty to the regime of Adolf Hitler, by adapting the curricula of the German School of Cartagena to the National Socialist ideology and sending confidential reports of a political and military nature to his superiors. (Note: Whealey (2015) notes that, since about 1935, Fricke was an informant for the Abwehr, the German military-intelligence service.) At the same time, he continued to increase his wealth thanks to the smuggling of German products in collusion with a few Spanish military authorities.

The departure of the Spanish Republic also aroused dissatisfaction among Fricke's regular clients, such as Admiral Juan Cervera Valderrama, the head of the Maritime Department of Cartagena at the time, who turned to Fricke for all kinds of reserved matters, especially the purchase of military equipment. Political unrest continued on the rise, as did the consul's prestige. In February 1936, Fricke was decorated with the first-class distinction of the Order of Beneficence in a mass event held in Cartagena, in which the Consul General of Germany in Barcelona, Otto Köcher, also presented him with a silver plaque. The result of the general elections held that same month, in which the Popular Front won, meant that some of Fricke's businesses fell through. Rumors began to circulate around the city that he was hiding, in his consulate, German nationals arrested by the Gestapo in Spanish territory in order to send them to concentration camps or to execute them.

=== The Civil War and the Second World War ===
The outbreak of the Spanish Civil War in 1936 and the recognition by Nazi Germany of the rebel faction in Burgos led to the abandonment of the Republican zone by the German diplomatic corps, with the exception of Karl Fricke. The latter chose to remain in Cartagena even though he had resigned from his position as consul, as he expected to continue profiting from smuggling, practicing military espionage once again, and giving his support to the local fifth column. (Note: In this regard, Riess says that at the beginning of the war he was "extremely active" in procuring soldiers and officers to the rebels, and that his commercial firm was "one of the greatest Nationalist munitions centers during the Civil War". Meanwhile, Egea Bruno (2009) differs when alluding to Fricke as the source of the testimonio de una persona cuyo nombre no puede revelar (testimony from a person whose name he cannot reveal) that Germany quoted at the League of Nations to denounce Soviet interference in the Spanish Civil War, through the unloading in Cartagena of arms and ammunition by the steamship Komsomol. Likewise, he mentions the reasons given for awarding him the Order of the Yoke and Arrows, which included having come to the aid of several people during the early days of the war in 1936, and who included entre ellas algunos sacerdotes (some priests among them).) The facilities of the German School were seized in November. But this would not be the last setback, because in early 1937, the Murcia military governor found out about the former consul and ousted him and his wife from Spain. Although twenty boxes and suitcases—which later disappeared— were confiscated during the search of his home, Fricke had had time to submit a report on the movements and plans of the Spanish Republican Navy and merchant fleet, which served to expose possible prey for the Kriegsmarine and to pinpoint Cartagena and its naval base as targets for aerial bombardment. One of the most relevant actions derived from this dossier was the sinking of the Republican submarine C-3 by the Germans in December 1936, which claimed 44 victims from a crew that was mostly from Cartagena.

With regards to the Fricke–Oliva couple, there are no known details about their whereabouts between 1937 and 1939, but as soon as the rebel faction achieved victory, they returned to Cartagena. There they were months later when the outbreak of the Second World War took them by surprise. The first noteworthy action of the returned consul was to arrange for the departure from Spain of the wife and sisters-in-law of his friend—now living in exile—Antonio Ros Sáez, as well as the release from prison of his uncle. This was followed by the shipment to occupied France of several million bales of wheat that the Republic had acquired from Argentina and that had arrived too late in the port city. At the same time, he organized exchanges of Republican currency, the trading of which was forbidden in Francoist Spain but which some countries continued to recognize. This, coupled with his unquestionable competence in the unlawful trafficking of goods, is why Franco Fernández has referred to him as the rey del estraperlo local. (Note: English: King of the local black market)

Starting in 1939, Fricke was able to resume his advocacy for education with the reopening of the German School, again with him as president of its board of trustees, and the founding, at his request, of the so-called German Academy of Munich. The latter was a section of the Hispania College in charge of teaching German-language classes during the afternoon and evening hours. With regards to the Second World War, Fricke compromised the Spanish neutrality—as he had done during the First World War—by ensuring that the German submarines were able to refuel in La Algameca. This was not an impediment for him to receive the award of the Imperial Order of the Yoke and Arrows from the Spanish authorities. Moreover, in February 1942, he arranged the burial—in a plot he owned at the Our Lady of the Remedies Cemetery—of three Luftwaffe pilots who died when their aircraft crashed near La Manga. (Note: The pilots remained buried in the Cartagena cemetery until the 1980s, when they were transferred to the German Military Cemetery of Cuacos de Yuste.)

Nonetheless, the success of his schemes was obscured by the death of his son Karl in the service of the Wehrmacht in 1944. (Note: Sources agree on the year of the disappearance of soldier Karl Fricke Oliva, 1944, but they differ about when or where exactly his death took place. Thus, Franco Fernández claims that he died in Norway in May, while Pérez Adán (2017) says it happened in Belarus in the summertime.) The loss caused his wife a severe mental breakdown and, according to sources consulted by Franco Fernández, drove Fricke to suicide. The latter's remains were buried at the Our Lady of the Remedies Cemetery, in a tomb adorned with Nazi symbolism that was removed in the 1950s. Meanwhile, the German School was dismantled sometime between late 1944 and mid-1945, coinciding with Germany's defeat in the global conflict, and it ended up being absorbed by the Hispania School.

== Bibliography ==
- Bisher, Jamie (2016). "Part 2: Strategic sideshow in Latin America, 1917–1918". The Intelligence War in Latin America, 1914–1922. Jefferson, North Carolina: McFarland & Company. ISBN 978-0-7864-3350-6.
- Egea Bruno, Pedro María (July–August 2009). "Cartagena: propaganda y guerra civil" (PDF). Cartagena Histórica (in Spanish) (30). Cartagena, Spain: Editorial Áglaya: 4–34. ISSN 1696-9901.
- Franco Fernández, Francisco José (March 2005). "El cónsul Fricke y los intereses del III Reich en Cartagena" (PDF). Cartagena Histórica. Cuaderno monográfico. (in Spanish) (16). Cartagena, Spain: Editorial Áglaya: 2–21. ISSN 1696-991X.
- Maestro López, Manuel (November 2015). "Espionaje naval en España durante la Gran Guerra" (PDF). Revista General de Marina (in Spanish). 269 (4). Madrid: Ministry of Defence (Spain): 641–656. ISSN 0034-9569.
- Martín Camino, Miguel (2010). ""Si quaeris miracula": la muralla púnica de la Casa de Misericordia (Cartagena) y la metamorfosis urbana del espacio del cerro de San José en la historiografía moderna" (PDF). Mastia (in Spanish) (9). Cartagena, Spain: Municipal Archaeological Museum of Cartagena: 79–110. ISSN 1579-3303.
- Martínez Mercader, Juana (October–December 2007). "Cartagena y la Segunda Guerra Mundial consideradas a través de la prensa local (1939-1945)" (PDF). Cartagena Histórica (in Spanish) (21). Cartagena, Spain: Editorial Áglaya: 3–15. ISSN 1696-9901.
- Martínez Ruiz-Funes, María José; Cerdá Mondéjar, Carmen María (2018). "El colegio alemán de Cartagena (1931–1944). Élites e ideología". Foro de Educación (in Spanish). 16 (25). FahrenHouse Ediciones: 27–47. doi:10.14516/fde.666. ISSN 1698-7802.
- Olaya Morales, Francisco (2005). Los traidores de la guerra civil: el papel de los funcionarios del Estado, los oligarcas y las potencias extranjeras durante la contienda nacional (in Spanish). Barcelona: Editorial Belacqva. ISBN 978-84-96326-34-7.
- Pérez Adán, Luis Miguel (July–September 2003). "Los submarinos del Káiser en las aguas de Cartagena (1915–1918)" (PDF). Cartagena Histórica (in Spanish) (4). Cartagena, Spain: Editorial Áglaya: 4–10. ISSN 1696-991X.
- Pérez Adán, Luis Miguel (2017). "La casa encantada del cónsul". Fotohistoria de Cartagena 1 (in Spanish). Cartagena, Spain: Malbec Ediciones. ISBN 978-84-946501-9-2.
- Pérez Adán, Luis Miguel (2022). "Sie starben für Führer und Vaterland". Fotohistoria de Cartagena 4 (in Spanish). Cartagena, Spain: Malbec Ediciones. ISBN 978-84-124158-0-3.
- Riess, Curt (1941). Total Espionage. New York City: G. P. Putnam's Sons.
- Rodríguez Martín, José Antonio (2016). "La renovación de la ciudad: eclecticismo y modernismo en Cartagena, 1875–1936". In Laborda Yneva, José (ed.). Guía del patrimonio arquitectónico de Cartagena (in Spanish). Cartagena, Spain: Polytechnic University of Cartagena. pp. 170–293. ISBN 978-84-16325-25-2.
- Whealey, Robert H. (2014). "Appendix B. German Intelligence Agents in Spain before July 1936". Hitler and Spain: The Nazi Role in the Spanish Civil War, 1936–1939. Lexington, Kentucky: University Press of Kentucky. ISBN 9780813148632.
