= Ramsay (nobility) =

Swedish and Finnish noble family

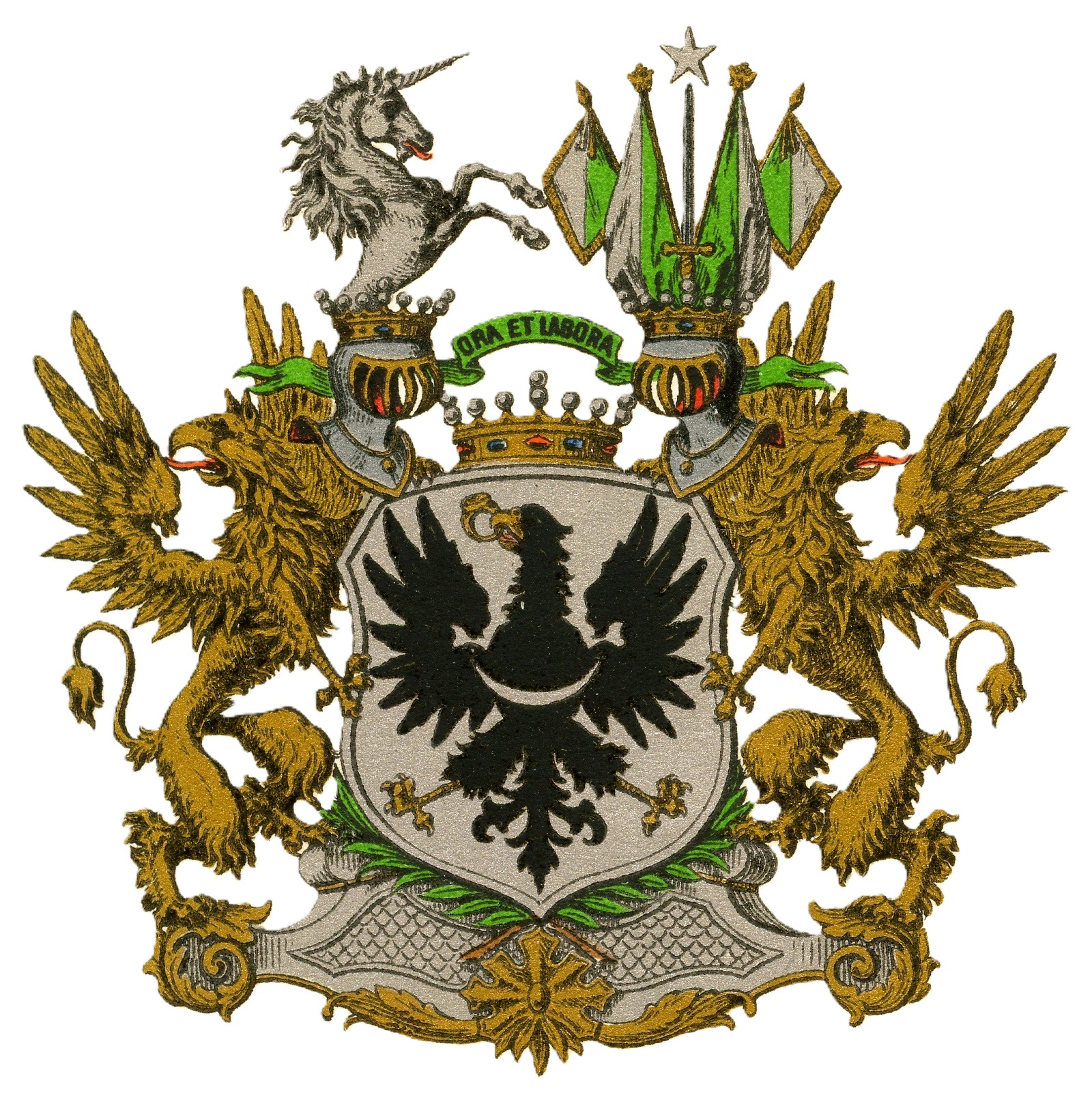
- The arms of Counts Ramsey
- Parent house: Clan Ramsay
- Country: Sweden, Finland, Russian Empire
- Motto: Ora et labora

The Ramsay family is a Swedish and Finnish noble family of Scottish origin. The family members bear the title of Baron in the Finnish nobility.

== Notable members ==
- Hans (Joan) Ramsay (1550-1649), progenitor of Swedish and Finnish branches
- Anders Erik Ramsay (1638-1735), Swedish Major General
- Anders Henrik Ramsay (1707–1782), Finnish Lieutenant General, Governor of Savo and Kyminkartano County
- Otto Wilhelm Ramsay (1743–1806), Finnish Governor of Kyminkartano
- Karl August Ramsay (1791–1855), Finnish Senator, Governor of Vyborg County
- Anders Edvard Ramsay (1799–1877), Finnish General of Infantry, Adjutant General of Russian Empire Army
- Alexander Wolter Ramsay (1825–1891), Finnish Industrialist
- Georg Edvard Ramsay (1834–1918), Finnish General of Infantry, Adjutant General of Russian Empire Army
- Arthur Richard Ramsay (1838-1915), Finnish Major General
- Allan Georg Ramsay (1839-1906), Finnish Lieutenant General
- Gustaf Adolf Ramsay (1842-1918), Finnish Major General
- August Ramsay (1859–1943), Finnish Mathematician, was married to Finnish historian and genealogist Jully Ramsay (1865–1919)
- Wilhelm Ramsay (1865–1928), Finnish Geologist, Member of the Royal Swedish Academy of Sciences
- William Ramsay (1867-1928), Finnish Politician, Owner of Nissback Estate
- Sir Henrik Ramsay CBE (1886–1951), Minister of Foreign Affairs of Finland, Economist

== Sources ==
- "Рамзай, баронский и дворянский род" . Brockhaus and Efron Encyclopedic Dictionary (in Russian). 1906.
