= Separate War (Finland) =

Historical thesis about Finland's role in the Continuation War

The separate war (Finnish: erillissota; Swedish: separatkrig) is a term used to describe Finland's conduct of the Continuation War (1941–1944). It has been used, and continues to be used, as a way of distancing Finland from the darkest aspects of the German regime during the Second World War.

== Background ==
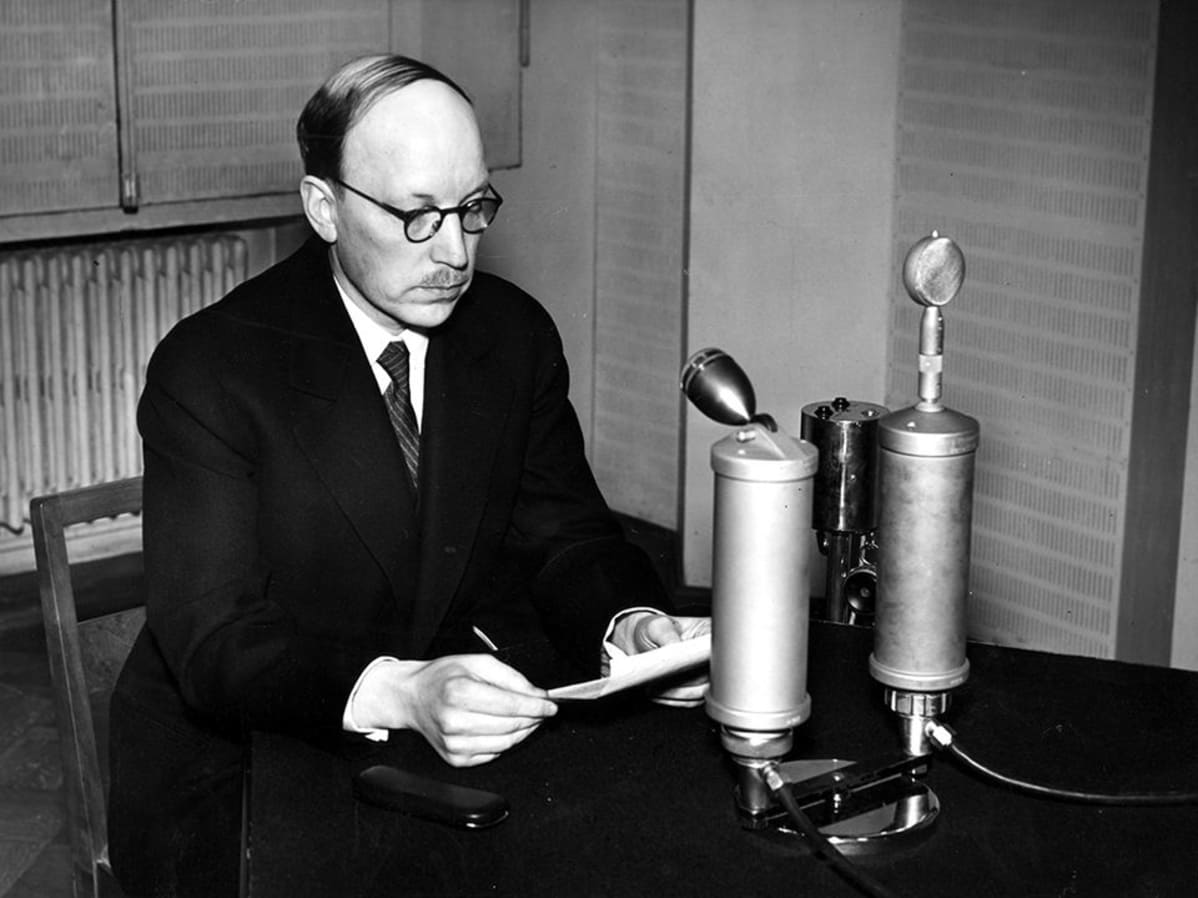
President Risto Ryti giving his radio address on the outbreak of the Continuation War, 26 June 1941.

The absence of any written treaty of alliance between Finland and Germany has been interpreted by several historians as meaning that Finland was not a proper German ally, but only a loosely associated co-belligerent — a "brother-in-arms" (aseveli/vapenbroder), as it was described in Finnish, Swedish, and German alike. In support of this interpretation it has been pointed out that Finland was informed of Operation Barbarossa only at a very late stage, in late May 1941, and did not take part in any joint planning beforehand.

Some weeks later, military-level guidelines were drawn up for the coming coalition cooperation, but the political pact sought by the German side was never concluded as a formal treaty between the two states. Germany had, since 1941, repeatedly sought a formal alliance, but the authority of Commander-in-Chief Mannerheim made it possible to fend off such demands and assert Finland's political and military independence.

== Arguments for the thesis ==
The closest Germany came to such a political pact was the so-called Ryti–Ribbentrop Agreement, to which Prime Minister Edwin Linkomies and President Risto Ryti agreed in the summer of 1944 under heavy German pressure, after Linkomies had already had the question of whether the president could enter into such a commitment in his own name investigated as early as spring 1943. The agreement, however, took the form of a personal letter from Ryti rather than a treaty between Finland and Germany, and it bound — in addition to Ryti himself — the government he had appointed. It ceased to apply when Ryti resigned in August 1944; his successor, Mannerheim, immediately declared that he did not consider himself bound by it, and Linkomies's government resigned for the same reason four days later, on 8 August 1944. Germany, for its part, regarded the agreement as a formal alliance, which gives the question an ambiguous status in the historiography.

Among the arguments advanced for the view that Finland fought its own, independent war is that the Finnish military leadership, despite repeated German requests, refused to attack Leningrad. The German–Finnish cooperation has also been described as lacking a shared ideological basis, since Germany's campaign was primarily motivated by racial-ideological and destructive aims that Finland's own conduct of the war did not share. A more unusual piece of evidence cited for the thesis is that Finnish soldiers of Jewish descent served at the front, in places alongside German troops, a situation without parallel elsewhere in Europe.

The fact that the political treaty sought by Germany was never concluded has been explained by Finland's status as a democracy, unlike the other co-belligerents on Germany's side, whose leadership was opposed to Nazi dictatorship. At the same time, Finland's leadership prepared for the possibility of a German victory, in part by arguing that Finland constituted a historically evolved, native "peasant democracy" that, unlike other states, lacked a class of plutocrats — a distinct form of society that it was hoped would be accepted even after a German victory.

A further argument advanced for the thesis is that, after the Moscow Armistice in September 1944, Finland turned militarily against its former brother-in-arms: in the Lapland War (October 1944 – April 1945), Finnish troops drove German forces out of northern Finland, a fact that has been cited as difficult to reconcile with the notion of a genuine ideological alliance.

== Arguments against the thesis ==
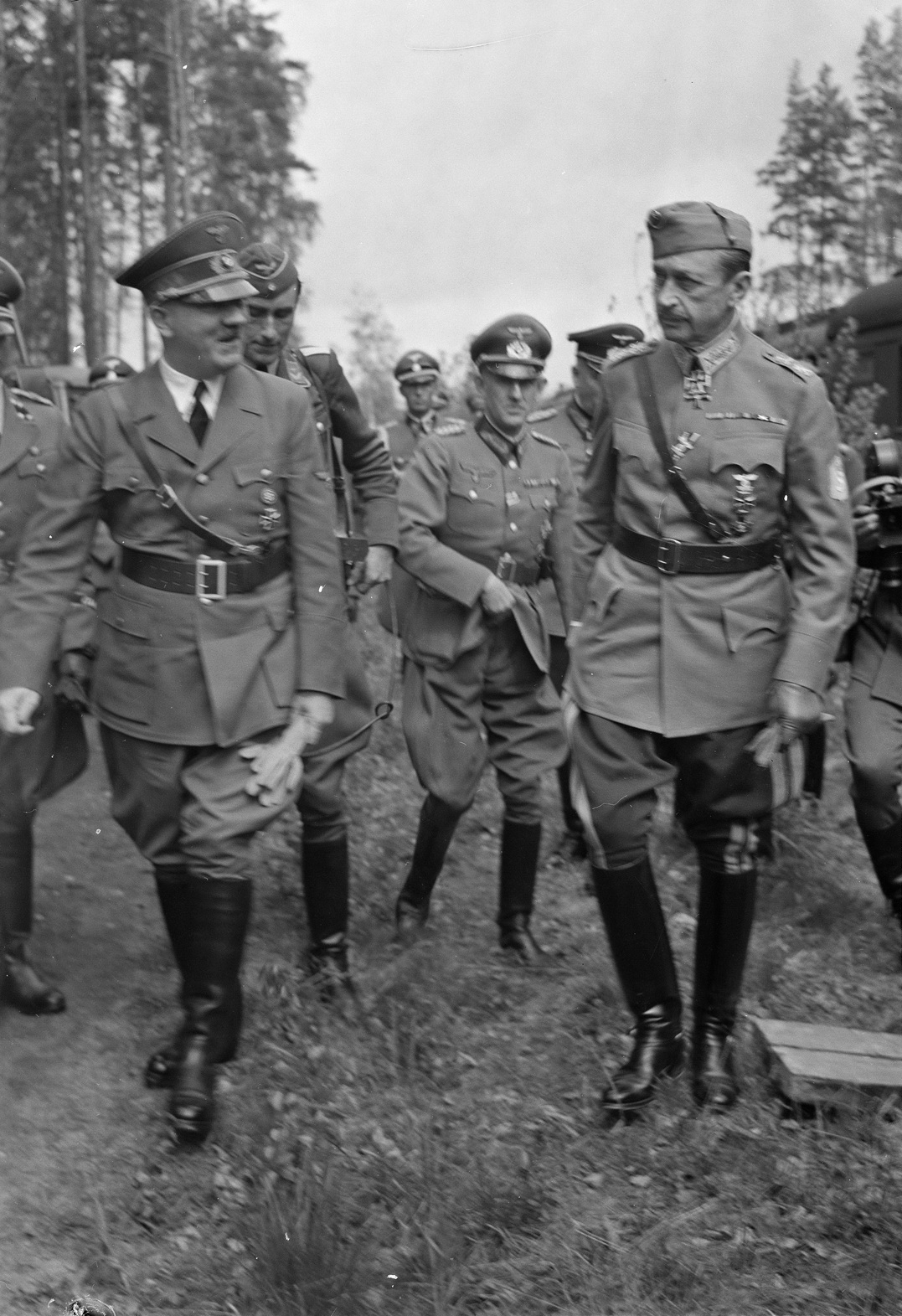
Adolf Hitler visited Marshal Mannerheim's 75th birthday celebrations in Finland on 4 June 1942, a visit later described by US Secretary of State Cordell Hull as an attempt to implicate Finland more closely with the Axis in the eyes of the world.

According to Uppslagsverket Finland, it is not possible to entirely dispute the existence of a military alliance, since Finland and Germany fought a common enemy, the Soviet Union. Finland, moreover, joined the German–Japanese Anti-Comintern Pact, directed against international communism, on 25 November 1941 — an accession that somewhat qualifies the picture of a cooperation entirely without ideological common ground. The Soviet Union, and later Russia, has consistently maintained that Finland was Nazi Germany's ally and therefore co-responsible for the Continuation War.

== Political use of the thesis ==
Germany was irritated by talk of a Finnish separate war, rhetoric that became increasingly pronounced after the Battle of Stalingrad and gave Germany considerable leverage over its smaller brother-in-arms. From the beginning of 1943, the separate-war thesis became in practice the chief instrument of Finnish foreign policy, pending the moment when Germany would no longer be strong enough to resort to reprisals while the Soviet Union had not yet succeeded in breaking through the front.

Germany was unable to prevent Finland from concluding, in effect, a separate peace with the Soviet Union in September 1944, which some have interpreted as showing that the Allies, too, ultimately accepted the thesis of a Finnish separate war.

== Historiography ==
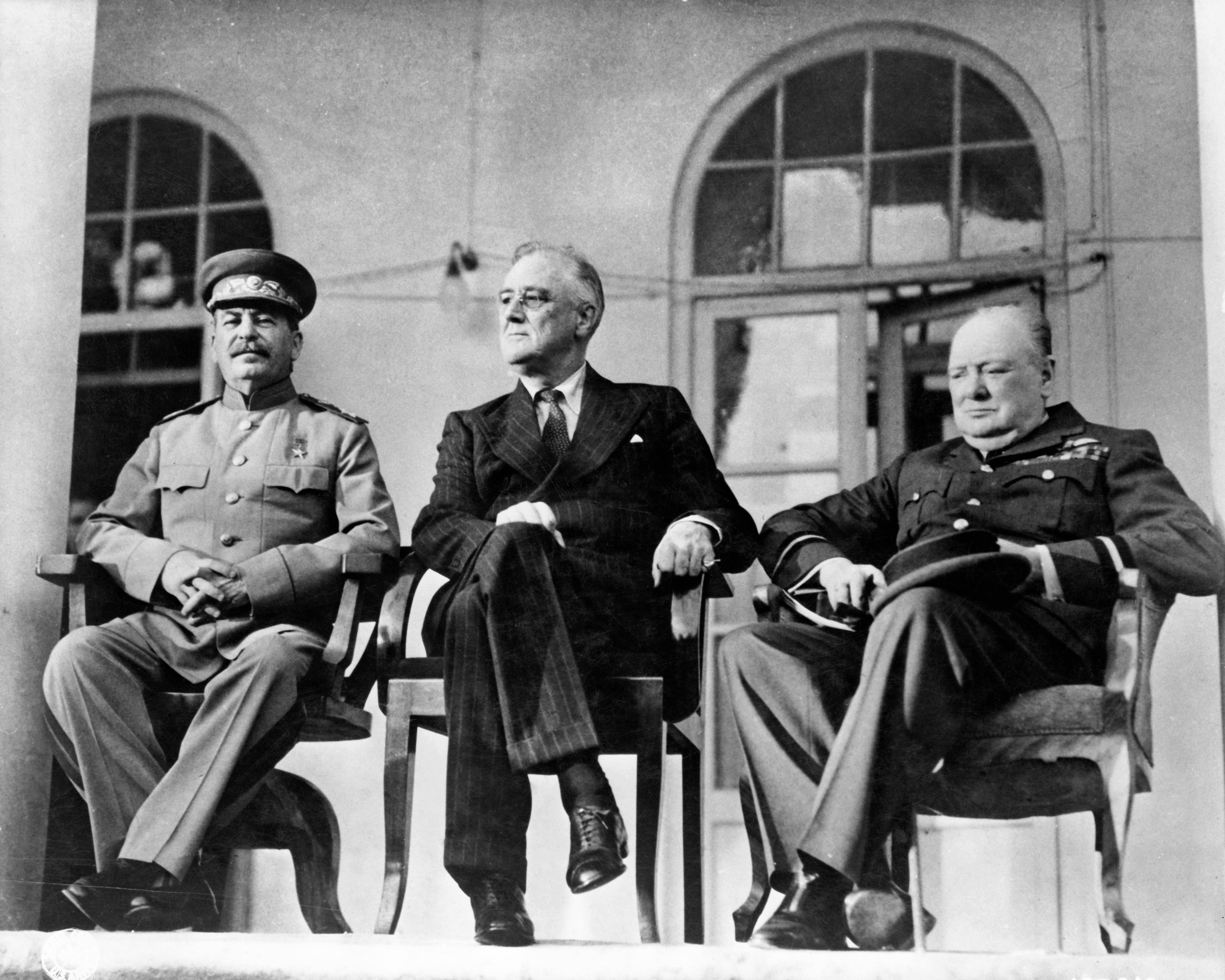
Joseph Stalin, Franklin D. Roosevelt, and Winston Churchill at the Tehran Conference, November–December 1943, where the Allies also discussed peace terms for Germany's co-belligerents.

The validity of the separate-war thesis has remained a subject of debate, though not to the same extent as the so-called driftwood theory (Finnish: ajopuuteoria; Swedish: drivvedsteorin). The two theories concern different phases and questions: the driftwood theory, launched in 1950 and generally considered refuted by Mauno Jokipii's 1987 research, addresses whether Finland's entry into the Continuation War in 1941 was the result of deliberate policy or whether the country was instead "swept along" by great-power events. The separate-war thesis instead concerns how the war was fought and what kind of co-belligerent Finland was, once it had entered the war.

The separate-war thesis returned to public debate in 2005, after President Tarja Halonen invoked it in a speech at the French Institute of International Relations (IFRI) in Paris on 1 March 2005, stating that Finland had fought "a separate war" against the Soviet Union. The speech drew a public protest from the Russian foreign ministry.

== See also ==
- Continuation War
- Ryti–Ribbentrop Agreement
- Lapland War
- Driftwood theory
