= Jully Ramsay =

Finnish historian (1865–1919)

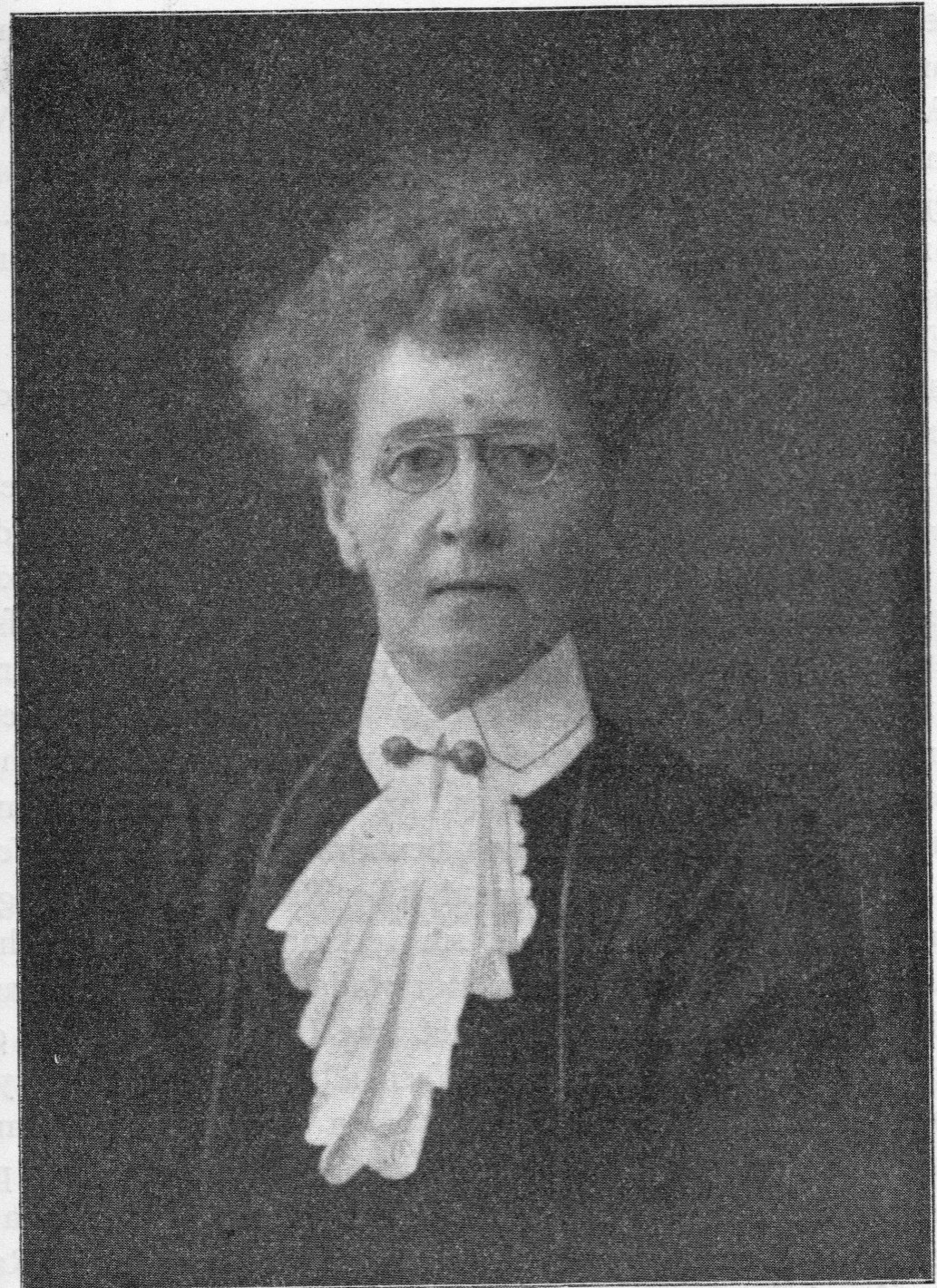
- Born: Julia Maria Ekström; 5 August 1865; Leppävirta, Grand Duchy of Finland
- Died: 24 March 1919 (aged 53); Helsinki, Finland
- Occupations: Historian, genealogist
- Notable work: Frälsesläkter i Finland intill stora ofreden (1909-1916)
- Spouse: August Ramsay (m. 1883)

Julia "Jully" Ramsay (née Ekström; 1865–1919) was a Finnish historian and genealogist.

== Career ==
Ramsay is notable not only as the first woman genealogist in Finland, but also as a pioneer of Finnish genealogy in general.

She is best remembered for her monumental four-part work, Frälsesläkter i Finland intill stora ofreden (lit. 'Noble families in Finland before the Great Wrath'), published 1909—1916, and based on her extensive archival research over many years.

She also published a personal history collection Skuggor vid vägen (lit. 'Shadows by the roadside') (1917) about 16th and 17th century events and people of Finland.

Ramsay was the first woman to be bestowed an honorary membership of the Genealogical Society of Finland, more than half a century before the next woman was granted the same honour.

She was also active in many other areas of society, including education and a deaf charity.

== Personal life ==
Julia Maria Ekström was born to an upper middle class family; her parents were the military engineering officer Carl August Ekström and Alexandrine née Hackman, of the Hackman industrial family.

She married, at age 18, the mathematician and finance executive, later Minister of Finance, August Ramsay, of the noble Ramsay family; the couple had five children, including the economist and politician Henrik Ramsay.

She died at the relatively young age of 53, following a long illness.

== Publications ==
- Frälsesläkter i Finland intill stora ofreden (1909-1916)
- Skuggor vid vägen (1917)
