= Karl August Ramsay =

Finnish politician

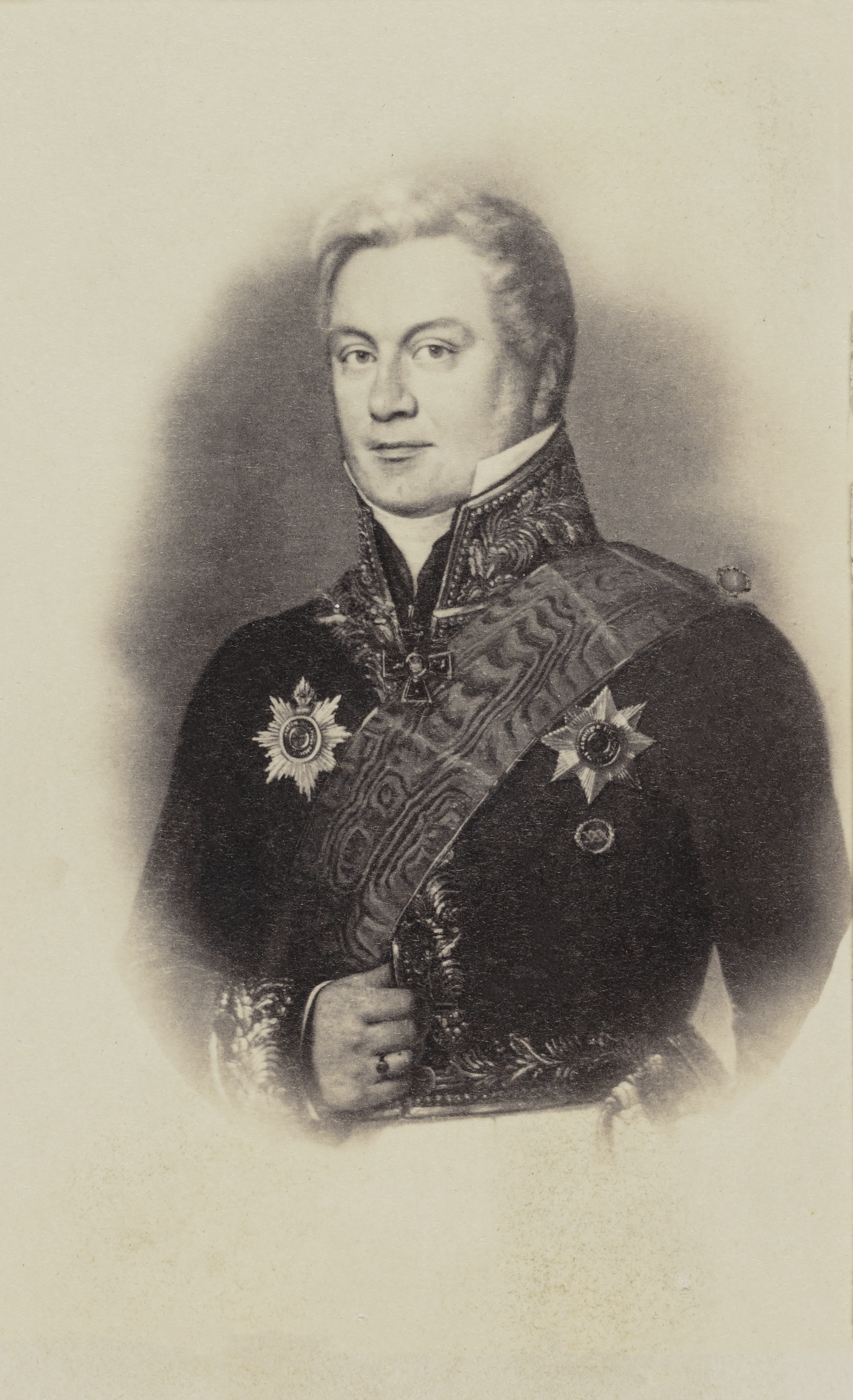
Karl August Ramsay

Karl August Ramsay (10 November 1791 – 8 December 1855) was a Finnish politician. Born in Kuopio, he was a member of the Senate of Finland. Ramsay belonged to the Ramsay noble family of Scottish origin. He died in Helsinki at the age of 64.
