= Otto Carl Köcher =

German diplomat (1884–1945)

Otto Carl Albrecht Köcher (15 January 1884 – 27 December 1945) was a lawyer and the Ambassador of Nazi Germany to Switzerland from 1937 until 1945 as well as Liechtenstein. He left the post on 30 April 1945 and was arrested on 31 July 1945 by American forces. Held at a prison camp in Ludwigsburg, he committed suicide on 27 December 1945.
