= Anthony F. Upton =

Anthony F. Upton (13 October 1929 – 4 July 2015) was a British professor of Nordic history.

== Biography ==
Born in Stockton Heath, Cheshire, he graduated B.A. in Modern History from Queen's College, Oxford, with First-Class honours in 1951, subsequently M.A. (Oxon). After leaving Oxford he travelled to the United States as a Fulbright Scholar and graduated A.M. in history from Duke University, NC, in 1953. On his return from the United States, he was appointed as an Assistant Lecturer in History at the University of Leeds. He moved to the University of St. Andrews in 1956 as a lecturer in history, and was promoted to Reader before being appointed Professor of Nordic History in 1983, becoming Professor Emeritus on his retirement in 1996. He was a fellow of the Royal Historical Society.

Upton published three books about the first decades (1918–1941) of Finnish independence. He received an honorary doctorate from the University of Helsinki on 2 June 2000.

He is best known for disputing the so-called "driftwood theory" (Finnish: Ajopuuteoria) of Finnish passivity in Operation Barbarossa.

== Works ==
- Finland in Crisis, 1940–1941, 1964, 318 pp.
- Communism in Scandinavia and Finland: Politics of Opportunity, 1973, 422 pp.
- Finland, 1939–1940, 1974, 174 pp.
- The Finnish Revolution 1917–1918, 1980, 608 pp.
- A Short History of Finland, 1998, 209 pp.
- Charles XI and Swedish Absolutism, 1998, 281 pp.
- Europe 1600–1789, 2001. 437 pp.
