= Quagmire theory =

Theory explaining the cause of the United States involvement in the Vietnam War

The quagmire theory explains the cause of the United States involvement in the Vietnam War. The quagmire theory suggests that American leaders had unintentionally and mistakenly led the country into the Vietnam War. The theory is categorized as an "orthodox" interpretation of the Vietnam War.

== Theory ==
Arthur Schlesinger presented the theory in his book The Bitter Heritage. Schlesinger was a U.S. historian who served a special assistant and court historian to President John F. Kennedy. According to the quagmire theory, as described by Schlesinger, the quagmire metaphor represented the one-step-at-a-time process that the U.S. inadvertently became entrapped in the military and diplomatic swamp of Vietnam. Schlesinger detailed the process of American involvement in a war that was not really in the American interest and as a result of inadvertent decision making and false hope.

In retrospect, Vietnam is a triumph of the politics of inadvertence. We have achieved our present entanglement, not after due and deliberate consideration, but through a series of small decisions. It is not only idle but unfair to seek out guilty men. Each step in the deepening of American commitment was reasonably regarded at the time as the last that would be necessary. Yet, in retrospect, each step led only to the next, until we find ourselves entrapped today in that nightmare of American strategists, a land war in Asia--a war which no president... desired or intended.

Schlesinger believed the war to be a "tragedy without villains" and identified nationalism rather than communism as the most influential factor driving US involvement in Vietnam. The U.S. estimation of the economic and security risks that Vietnam could cause was exaggerated. The incorrect assessment of the situation in Vietnam led the U.S. leadership into a series of bad decisions that resulted in the Vietnam War, according to the quagmire theory.

Daniel Ellsberg argued against Schlesinger's theory in an essay titled "The Quagmire Myth and the Stalemate Machine." Ellsberg argued that while there were times when American policymakers were optimistic, and thought their current step would be the last, they did not take important steps--make decisions significantly to escalate--at those times. The crucial decisions were made when they understood that things were going badly, and that the step they were authorizing was not likely to work well enough to be the last.

== Vietnam and U.S. History ==
The Vietnam saga started with the colonization of the country by the French in 1887. In 1941, Japan tried to expand its empire by invading Vietnam. The Vietminh, a communist guerilla group, formed in order to successfully drive off the Japanese. After World War II, Harry S. Truman instituted the foreign policy of containment. First presented in 1946, the goal was to try to contain communism and keep it from spreading around the world. In the same year, the First Indochina War commenced. This war between the Vietminh and the French concluded with the Battle of Dien Bien Phu, a decisive victory for the Vietminh. Two states emerged from the First Indochina War: the Communist-ruled north and the south, split by the 17th parallel-agreed upon at the Geneva Conference in 1954. Soon after, in 1955, war broke out between the north and south. Domino theory, a well-accepted theory during that time period, introduced by Dwight D. Eisenhower, stated that if one country fell to communism, then the rest of southeast Asia would fall to communism.

The U.S involvement did not come without warning. French president Charles de Gaulle warned John F. Kennedy that Vietnam was a "a bottomless military and political swamp.". In 1963, with the approval of the CIA, South Vietnam president Ngo Dinh Diem was overthrown and killed. This sparked a tumultuous period in south Vietnamese politics with many leaders taking over and then quickly losing power. This allowed the north to establish ideological strongholds in the south.

In 1973 the Paris Peace Accords were agreed to, officially ending U.S involvement in Vietnam. Its final troops left in 1973.

== See also ==
- Driftwood theory
