= Erwin Poensgen =

German ambassador of Nazi Germany to Venezuela

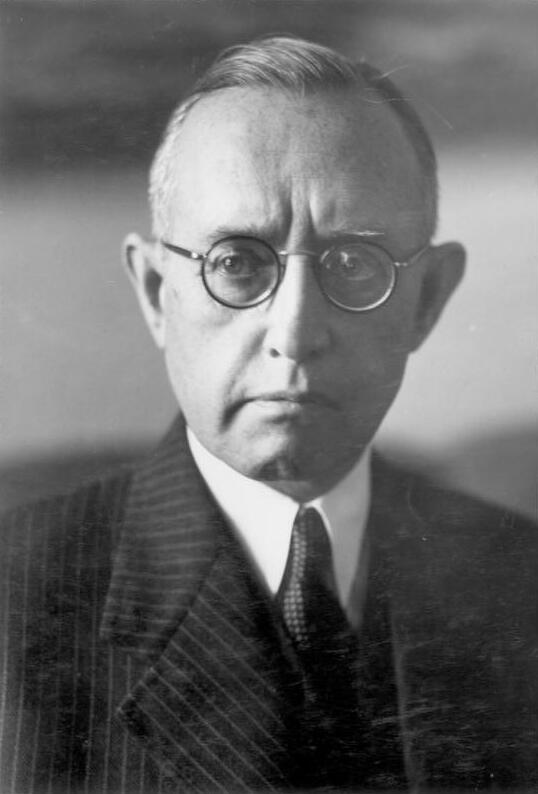
Bundesarchiv Bild 183-C04221, Legationsrat Erwin Poensgen (1882–1966)

Erwin Poensgen (1882-1966), who was not a member of the Nazi Party, was the Ambassador of Nazi Germany to Venezuela from 1937 until 1941.
