= Driftwood theory =

Political theory regarding Finland in WWII

The driftwood theory (Finnish: ajopuuteoria, Swedish: drivvedsteorin) states that Finland's involvement in the Second World War was the consequence of inadvertent decisions made on the basis of a limited choice of policies, emphasizing its reactive stance rather than inherent aggression.

The first arguments that Finland drifted into the Continuation War were made for the war responsibility trials in 1945 by the Hornborg committee, whose final report criticized Finnish political leadership for being passive and fatalistic. In the actual war responsibility trials of 1945–1946, the defense claimed that the defendants lacked active responsibility for the outbreak and continuation of the conflict.

In 1948, the professor and historian Arvi Korhonen anonymously published the book Finland in the World War II, in which he interpreted Finland as having acted only as the defender of Western society against communism, and denied all collaboration with Germany. During the war, the German ambassador Wipert von Blücher had written in 1950 that Finland had been at the great powers' mercy, entirely without the possibility of an independent political solution. In his memoirs, Blücher used the analogy of a piece of driftwood to describe Finland's situation: "In the battle of great powers the free will of small states has very narrow limits. Finland was drawn into the whirlpools of great power politics the way a swift Finnish stream snatches a driftwood."

Opposing viewpoints also formed, and in 1957 American Charles Leonard Lundin published Finland in the Second World War, in which he emphasized Finns' activeness and guilt in the war. However, the work contained factual errors, which inspired Arvi Korhonen to write Operation Barbarossa and Finland, again representing Finland as the innocent victim of great-power politics. Korhonen cited Blücher and established the driftwood theory, according to which Finland was forced into involvement in the world war.

== Critique and rebuttal of the theory ==
The theory was popular in Finnish historiography after the war, but, it has since been shown not to correspond to historical events, since the closer relationship with Germany had begun as the result of an informed choice. This rebuttal began in the 1960s with foreign research, led by Hans Petter Krosby in the US and Anthony F. Upton in the UK. Finnish historians were directed until the late '60s by a "literary conscription", which overrode the requirement of objectivity in research.

Even Finnish researchers admitted by the end of the 1970s that the theory was incorrect. However, the Finnish elite and public were reluctant to abandon it. For example, Finnish president Urho Kekkonen was opposed by the majority of the right-wing press when he agreed to Krosby's thesis in 1974, at the 30th anniversary of the war's ending. At the end of the same year, the social democratic Demokraatti's right-wing columnist Simo Juntunen critiqued in a speech given to war veterans the abandonment of the driftwood theory by saying of Kekkonen's views: "I don't know whether the President's attempts to rewrite Finnish history are depressing or pathetic...or whether we are settling our oil bill by selling our history." Kekkonen was angered by Juntunen's speech and sent the editor Aimo Kairamo one of his infamous letters of criticism, after which Juntunen was sacked from the paper. Driftwood theory was finally rebutted by Mauno Jokipii in 1988 with his study The Birth of the Continuation War, in which Jokipii showed that Finland started the war voluntarily. Its motivations included the desire to get rid of the Soviet Union's constant pressure on the country.

=== The log boat theory ===
The driftwood theory was developed into the log boat theory in the 1960s, supported by among others Eino Jutikkala. The theory states that Finnish approaches to Nazi Germany and commitment to Operation Barbarossa were conscious decisions, but nevertheless tied to the circumstances. Sweden could not secure Finland from Soviet pressure and contemporary sources suggest that reasonable fear of a new Soviet attack led Finland to the Germans. This theory was in effect a softer and more refined version of the driftwood theory.

== See also ==
- Quagmire theory
- War-responsibility trials in Finland

== Bibliography ==
- Suomen kohtalonaikoja: muistelmia vuosilta 1935–44. WSOY. 1950.
- "Ajopuuteorian kaksi käytäntöä" (19/95). Helsingin yliopisto. 1995.
- "Jatkosodan synty suomalaisen menneisyyden kipupisteenä" (PDF). 21 June 2001: aliokirjoitus. Archived from the original (PDF) on 25 September 2007.
- "Kronikka haastattelee: Yli kynnyksen" (PDF) (3). Helsingin yliopiston historian opiskelijoiden ainejärjestö Kronos ry. 2007.
- Jatkosodan pikkujättiläinen. WSOY. 2005.
- Miten Suomi valloitetaan -Puna-armeijan operaatiosuunnitelmat 1939–1944. Weilin+Göös. 2008.
- "Ajopuuteoria – kirjallista asevelvollisuutta". Sanoma Osakeyhtiö. 20 June 1991: A2.
- Silvennoinen, Oula (2008). "Presidenttifoorumi 19.11.2008" (PDF). Suomen tasavallan presidentti -sivusto. Tasavallan presidentin kanslia. pp. Alustuspuheenvuoro presidentti Tarja Halosen VIII Presidenttifoorumissa 19 November 2008. Archived from the original (PDF) on 21 February 2015.
- Tilli, Jouni (Autumn 2006). "Luovutuskeskustelu menneisyyspolitiikkana – Elina Sanan Luovutetut jatkosotaan liittyvän historiapolicyn kritiikkinä -" (pdf). Jyväskylän yliopisto, Yhteiskuntatieteiden ja filosofian laitos. pp. Pro gradu -tutkielma.
- "Jatkosota – erillissota?". Sanoma Osakeyhtiö. 30 November 2008: A2.

== External sources ==
- Eepos, Suomen historian käsikirja, WSOY, ISBN 951-0-27651-0
- Jatkosodan harhautus
