= Ernst Wendler =

German diplomat (1890 - 1986)

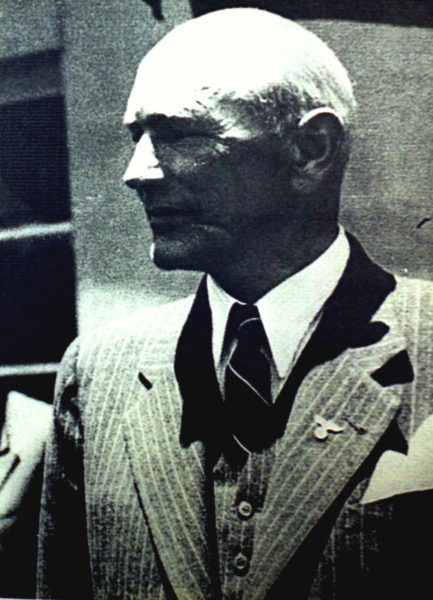
- Ernst Wendler as the ambassador to Bolivia

German Ambassador to Bolivia
- In office 1937 – July 22, 1941

German Ambassador to Thailand
- In office 1943–1945

Personal details
- Born: April 24, 1890 Ulm, Kingdom of Württemberg, German Empire
- Died: March 31, 1986 (aged 95) Reutlingen, Baden-Württemberg, West Germany

Military service
- Allegiance: German Empire
- Branch/service: Imperial German Army
- Unit: Jagdstaffel 17

Ernst Wendler (April 24, 1890 - March 31, 1986) was a German diplomat and businessman. Wendler served as the ambassador of Nazi Germany to Bolivia from 1938 to 1941, and to Thailand from 1943 to 1945. He was also the Consul at the German Consulate-General in New Orleans, United States, from 1934 to 1936, and was succeeded by Edgar von Spiegel. As ambassador to Bolivia, he engaged with pro-Nazi elements in the Bolivian government and was eventually expelled under President Enrique Peñaranda.

== Early life and education ==
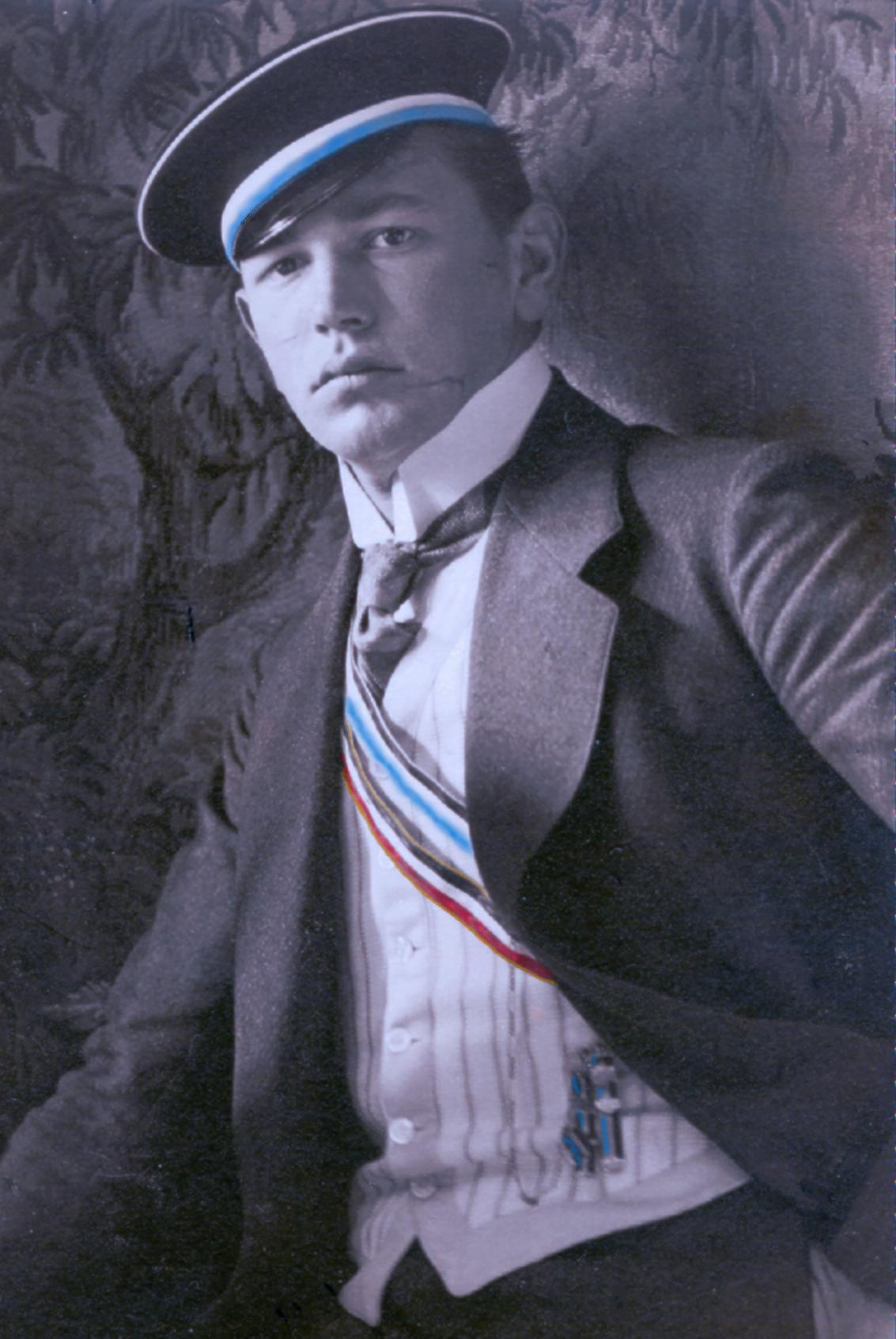
Wendler in 1909

Ernst Wendler was born on April 24, 1890, in Ulm within the Kingdom of Württemberg in the German Empire. His parents were Eberhard Wendler (1864–1933), who was a textile manufacturer, and Wilhelmine Wendler (née Reinwald; 1865–1932). Wendler attended Friedrich-List-Gymnasium Reutlingen until 1907. He then began studying law at the Ludwig-Maximilians-Universität München (LMU) in Munich, but ended up completing his law studies at the University of Giessen. In 1908, Wendler was recruited the Corps Suevia München.

During World War I, Wendler served in the Luftstreitkräfte of the Imperial German army as part of the Royal Prussian Jagdstaffel 17.

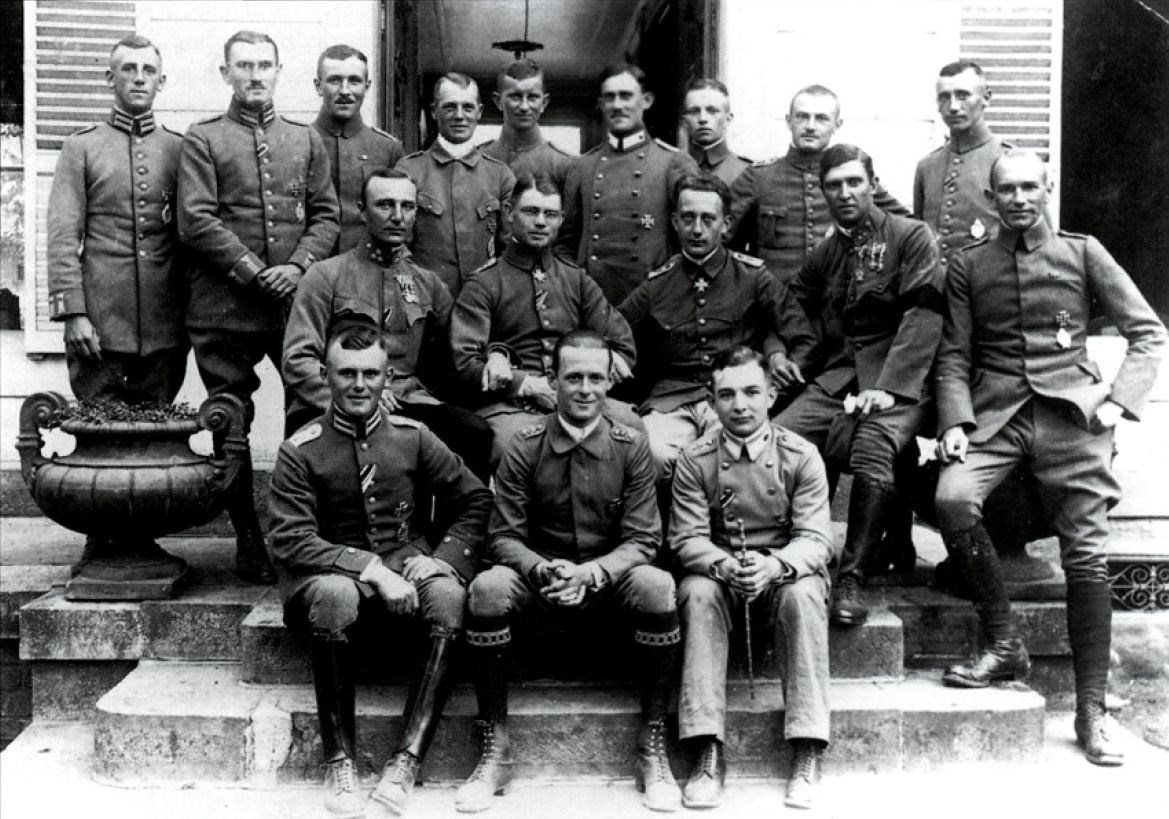
Wendler (furthest to the right in the middle row) in June 1917 when he was part of Jagdstaffel 17

== Diplomatic career ==
=== Ambassador to Bolivia ===
During Wendler's time as ambassador, there were prominent parts of the Bolivian government that held pro-Nazi sympathies. On 9 April 1939, he was invited to a meeting with the President of Bolivia, Germán Busch, who requested from Wendler the "moral and material support' of Nazi Germany and other anti-Comintern nations in order "to establish order and authority in the state through a complete change in the system and the transition to a totalitarian state form." Busch asked that this be done by Germany providing advisors to his government. Wendler was quite interested in Busch's proposal and subsequently on April 18 sent cables to Berlin which included additional plans for economic collaboration and the formation of an anti-Comintern group composed of Argentina, Bolivia, and Paraguay. Before the Nazi Foreign Office in Berlin replied to Wendler, they sent him a message on April 13 telling him to be reserved and to end giving advice to the Bolivian government. The Foreign Office then replied on April 22 saying that, "it would not be in the interests of the President himself nor in the interest of good relations between our two countries if the introduction of a change in the system and the transition to a totalitarian form of government could be linked in any way with German support. The German government wishes to avoid any conspicuous measures, such as the sending of a staff of advisors before any such change had taken place." State Secretary at the Foreign Office Ernst von Weizsäcker also called on Wendler to avoid any rift between Germany and Busch's government, and that German advisors could be considered later. He also suggested that Wendler make it clear that the Foreign Office didn't speak for the other anti-Comintern nations, and that any future cables on the matter not be addressed to Adolf Hitler. Despite this, Busch declared totalitarian rule on 24 April 1939.

A new Bolivian government led by Enrique Peñaranda succeeded Busch and declared a state of siege in the nation on July 24, 1941. This was due to the discovering of a letter allegedly sent from Major Elias Belmonte, who was the Bolivian military attaché in Berlin, to Wendler in La Paz which declared that "the time is approaching to carry out our coup to liberate my poor country from a weak government of completely capitalist inclinations." It had been presented to Ostria Gutiérrez, the Foreign Minister of Bolivia, by Douglas Jenkins, the American ambassador to Bolivia. The authenticity of the letter is debatable, with Wendler saying that "the charges against the legation are pure fabrications." He was subsequently declared by the Bolivian government as a persona non grata, and expelled to Antofagasta, Chile on July 22.

=== Ambassador to Thailand ===
Wendler served as the German ambassador to Thailand from 1943 to 1945 during World War II. As ambassador, he made communicated with other Nazi officials stationed in Asia, such as Wendler travelling to Shanghai on 1 December 1941. He also attended the opening of the Bangkok Conference on 22 June 1942. The conference saw the formation of the pro-Japanese All-India Independence league and Bangkok resolutions.

== Sources ==
- Green, L.C. (1948), The Indian National Army Trials. The Modern Law Review, Vol. 11, No. 1. (Jan., 1948), pp. 47-69., London, Blackwell.
- Kratoska, Paul H (2002), Southeast Asian Minorities in the Wartime Japanese Empire., Routledge., ISBN 0-7007-1488-X
