= Rolf Witting =

Finnish politician (1879–1944)

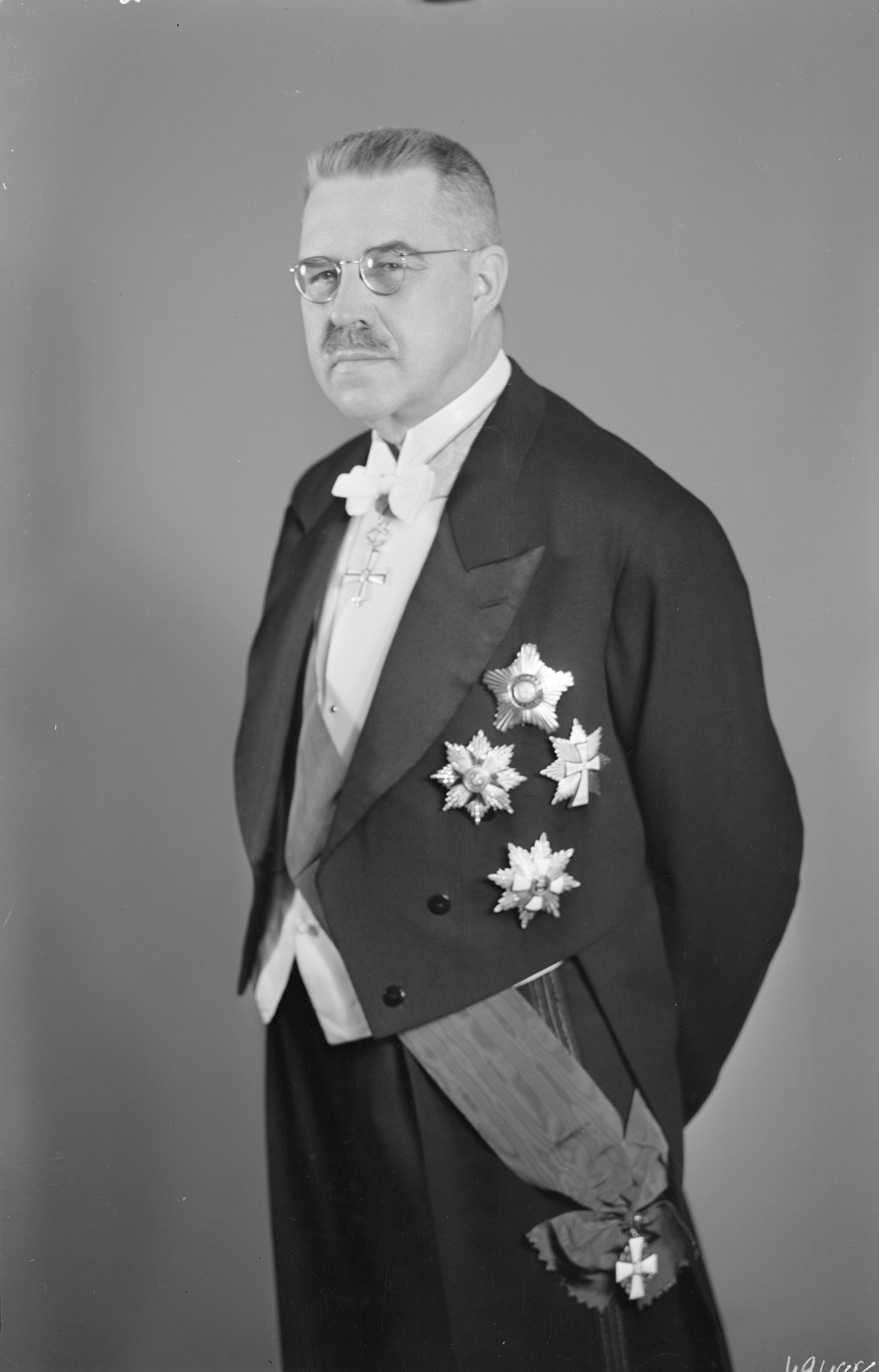
- Witting in 1943.

Minister of Transport and Public Works
- In office 22 November 1924 – 31 March 1925
- Prime Minister: Lauri Ingman
- Preceded by: Eero Hahl
- Succeeded by: Jalo Lahdensuo
- In office 4 July 1930 – 21 March 1931
- Prime Minister: Pehr Evind Svinhufvud; Juho Sunila
- Preceded by: Kyösti Kallio
- Succeeded by: Juho Niukkanen

Minister of Foreign Affairs
- In office 27 March 1937 – 5 March 1943
- Prime Minister: Risto Ryti; Johan Wilhelm Rangell
- Preceded by: Väinö Tanner
- Succeeded by: Henrik Ramsay

Personal details
- Born: 30 September 1879 Viipuri, Grand Duchy of Finland, Russian Empire
- Died: 11 October 1944 (aged 65) Porvoon maalaiskunta, Finland
- Party: Swedish People's Party
- Spouse: Ellen Julie Elise Neovius (1904–)
- Occupation: Politician, Professor, CEO
- Profession: Professor

Rolf Johan Witting (30 September 1879 in Viipuri – 11 October 1944 in Porvoon maalaiskunta) was a Finnish oceanographist and politician, member of four of Finland's cabinets 1924–1943.

== Scientific career ==
Witting graduated as Abitur in 1897, Candidate of Philosophy in 1901, Master of Philosophy in 1907, Licentiate 1909 and Doctor of Philosophy in 1910. He served as the director-general of the Finnish Institute of Marine Research from 1918–1936.

== Politics ==
He was elected as a Member of Parliament on 1 May 1924 from Uusimaa constituency. He was deputy minister for Foreign Affairs 1934–1936, and the Minister of Foreign Affairs 1937–1943.

Witting served in business life as a head of corporate government in the Hanken School of Economics, the Delegation of the Finnish Academies of Science and Letters and the Geographical Society of Finland. Also he was as a member of corporate government in Teollisuushypoteekkipankki, Suomen pankkiyhdistys and Hufvudstadsbladet.

Political offices
Preceded by Väinö Tanner	Minister of Foreign Affairs; 1940-1943	Succeeded by Carl Henrik Ramsay
