= Christian Zinsser =

German lawyer and diplomat (1907–1993)

- Born: December 26, 1907; Saxony, German Empire
- Died: March 12, 1993 (aged 85); Munich, Germany
- Occupations: Lawyer; diplomat

Christian Zinsser (December 26, 1907 – March 12, 1993) was a German lawyer and diplomat during the period of the Third Reich and the German Federal Republic. Known for being the German consul in Honduras in 1941 and having served at the German consulate in Manchukuo during 1942–1945.

== Biography ==
=== Early life ===
Zinsser was born in the municipality of Bärenstein in Saxony, during the time of the German Empire. He had a comfortable childhood, it is known that his father was a Protestant priest although very little is known about his mother. At the age of 20, he studied law and joined the Nazi Party seeing himself very interested in National Socialism on August 15, 1927, and in 1930 he became an adviser to the administration of the Saxon court. Beginning in 1932, Zinsser was registered with residences in Leipzig and Dresden. On June 20, 1932, he rejoined the National Socialist organizations; for by the spring of 1932 he had been released from service in the Saxon court administration to represent the Hitler Youth in Rome in the Gruppi Universitaria Fascist. In 1935, Zinsser passed the second state law examination. By April 1 of 1936, he had become an attaché at the Ministry of Foreign Affairs, had passed the diplomatic consular examination in 1937, and had worked on foreign assignments.

=== Arrival in Honduras ===
Zinsser was accredited to the German Reich embassy in Warsaw after Poland was partitioned between Germany and the Soviet Union following the Molotov Ribbentrop Pact. His stay would be short since by the beginning of December 1939 he would be transferred to the American continent. On December 19, 1939, after the sinking of the Admiral Graf Spee, Zinsser was already in Montevideo when it was reported that the envoy Hans Langsdorff had killed himself using a firearm. Zinsser was then appointed envoy extraordinary and minister plenipotentiary of the German Reich in Central America. From then on, at the beginning of 1941, he settled in the city of Tegucigalpa as consul of Nazi Germany in Honduras during the regime of General Tiburcio Carias Andino. During his stay in the country, another German sent to Central America, Robert Motznach, committed suicide after an argument with Zinsser, which aroused certain intrigues towards his person. His chargé d'affaires in San Salvador, Richard von Heynitz, had disappeared for two days when the police found him dead after being shot on a lonely road. Once this was reported, more mistrust of him was generated by the Honduran government and neighboring countries. During his stay in Tegucigalpa, Zinsser protested against an anti-Nazi film shown in one of the capital's cinemas and expressed indignation towards the anti-Nazi articles that were published in the newspaper "La Época".

On March 22, 1941, Jorge Ubico Castañeda had already declared Zinsser persona non grata. The dictator Carías Andino decided to expel the diplomat from the country thanks to reports from Great Britain and considering him "fifth column in Central America with ties to the German Gestapo." The Honduran government had also been informed that the Diplomat was "the most dangerous and intelligent of the Nazi agents in all of Latin America today." It had also been reported that he was the one who gave direct instructions to the German ambassador in Guatemala, in addition to having an ominous past in Warsaw, before the fall of Poland, and with some secret moves in Argentina, Chile and Panama. Zinsser was expelled from the country; he travelled to Tampico, Mexico and on to Japan.

=== Stay and capture in Asia ===
Zinsser was transferred to occupied Shanghai, China on April 16, 1941, from where Attaché Franz Ferring took over, traveling to Los Angeles via the Japanese steamship Asama Maru in May 1941 to take over Zinsser's post. The diplomat arrived in Shanghai on June 2, 1941, at which time the city was in the hands of the Japanese imperial navy. He was a member of the newly opened Reich General Consulate in the Nationalist Government of Nanjing, represented Martin Fischer as chief when the latter was meanwhile acting ambassador.

On September 1, 1945, Zinsser was arrested by the Red Army in Changchun province in Manchukuo after Operation August Storm, time before the surrender of Japan and the end of World War II. During his stay in the Soviet Union along with other German and Japanese prisoners of war, Zinsser was tried by the authorities due to his sympathy for National Socialism and his collaboration and activity in the Nationalist Government of Nanjing and Manchukuo, which were puppet states of Japan, after this he was sentenced to 25 years of work in the Gulag on October 28, 1945. On August 1, 1953, almost completing eight years as a prisoner, Zinsser was transferred to Camp 10 where he would remain another two years.

=== Later life ===
With the return of about ten thousand German prisoners of war, Zinsser manages to return to West Germany on December 15, 1955. In 1957, Zinsser was accepted into the Foreign Service of the Federal Republic of Germany as a Legionnaire Councilor Second Class. Here he reached the rank of consul general. He worked in the Middle East Section of the Department of the Orient and was later sent to Portugal as a Counselor in Tehran. In 1969 he was appointed consul general in Porto Alegre and retired in 1972. He died in 1993, in Munich at the age of 86.

== See also ==
- Honduras in World War II
- History of Honduras
- Operation Bolívar
