= Anders Edvard Ramsay =

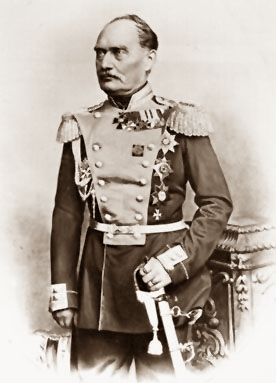

Anders Edvard Ramsay (23 March 1799 in Kuopio – 12 May 1877 in Helsinki) was a Finnish civil servant serving in the Russian Imperial Army, and served as the General of the Finnish Guards' Rifle Battalion from 1829 to 1838.

== See also ==
- Ramsay (Russian nobility)
