= Henrik Ramsay =

Finnish politician (1886–1951)

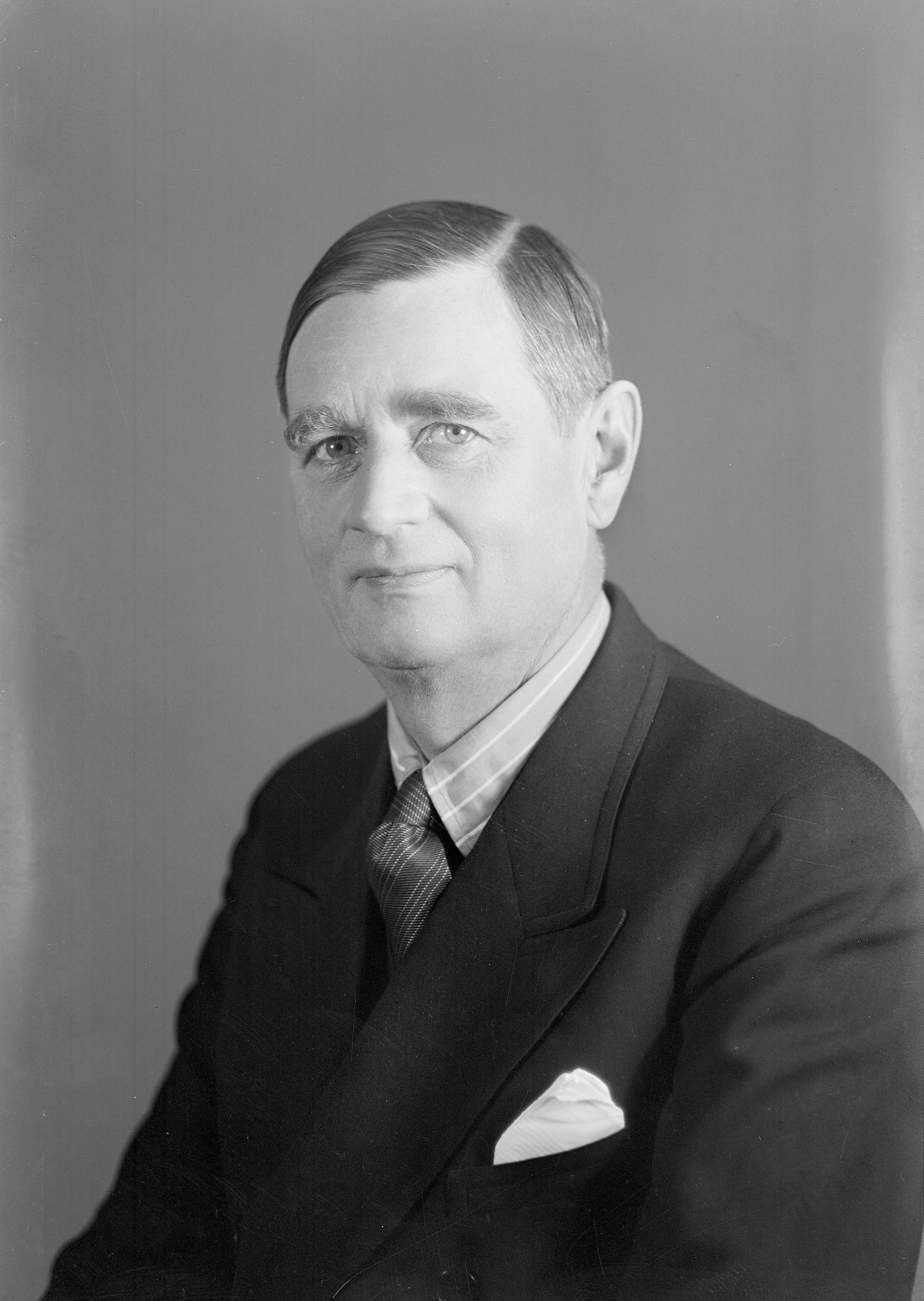
- Ramsay in 1941.

Minister of Foreign Affairs
- In office 4 March 1943 – 8 August 1944
- Prime Minister: Edwin Linkomies
- Preceded by: Rolf Witting
- Succeeded by: Carl Enckell

Personal details
- Born: Carl Henrik Wolter Ramsay; 31 March 1886 Helsinki, Finland
- Died: 25 July 1951 (aged 65) Visby, Sweden
- Party: Swedish People's
- Education: University of Helsinki
- Occupation: Economist

Carl Henrik Wolter Ramsay CBE (31 March 1886 – 25 July 1951) was a Finnish politician and an economist from the Swedish People's Party. Ramsay is mostly remembered for the fact that he was sentenced in the war-responsibility trials in 1946.

== Biography ==
=== Early life ===
His father was statesman August Ramsay and his mother was Jully Ramsay, a historian and genealogist. He belonged to a Scottish noble family, of Clan Ramsay (Dalhousie) emigrated to Finland in the 17th century and he was one of the few in Finland entitled to use the title Sir, however, Ramsay did not use the title. Henrik Ramsay completed his Ph.D. in chemistry in 1909 at Helsinki University and worked after graduating as a sugar chemist in Russia and afterwards as a director of a sugar refinery in Helsinki. Ramsay was the first in Finland to be awarded the CBE Commander of the British Empire when he was conferred the order in 1934.

=== World War 2 ===
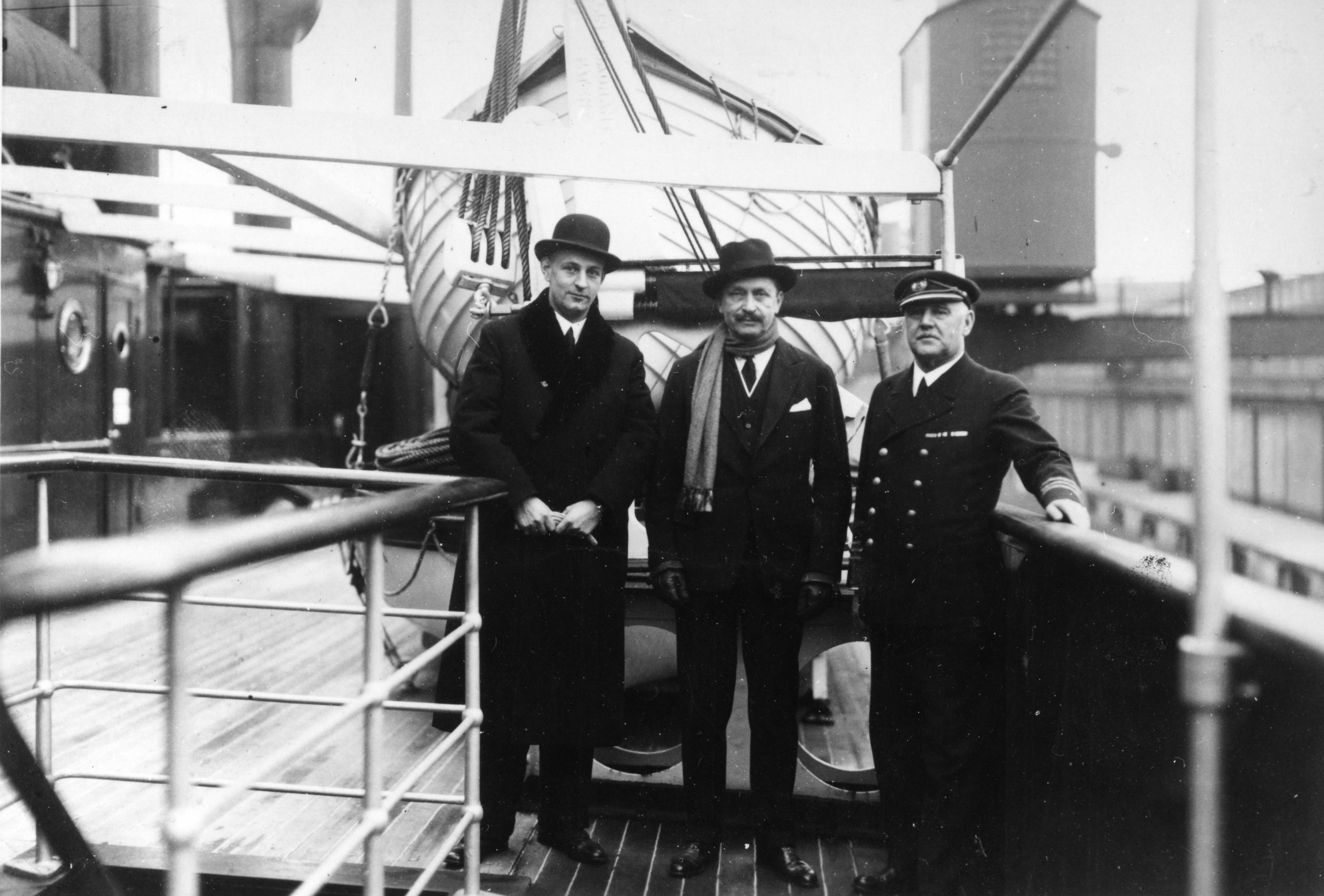
Ramsay, Carl Gustaf Emil Mannerheim and Harry Rönngren onboard S/S Ariadne, 1934

Minister Ramsay was a versatile actor in the Finnish society since the 1910s. Ramsay was a member of the central committee of the Swedish People's Party from 1917 to 1935, of which the period 1922–1935 he was the party's deputy chairman. However, he is relatively unknown in spite of serving as the minister of foreign affairs from 1943–1944.

Ramsay's attitudes and opinions were often same as those of Mannerheim. It was due to the fact that Ramsay and the marshal had a close relationship. Both had similar perceptions of the situation and its requirements. After the armistice, Mannerheim, as the president of the republic, wanted Ramsay to be his prime minister. However, the Swedish People's Party prevented his premiership.

Foreign Minister Ramsay's extensive network of relationships allowed him to have weight for his opinions after the German collapse when the Finnish government turned their eyes towards the Allies. However, Risto Ryti said that Ramsay had insufficient capacity for initiative and activity. Also Nazi Germany narrowed the maneuverability of Finnish foreign policy.

Ramsay was able to get a sense of proprietary information from American and Swedish decision-makers. Good relations with Finland by diplomats improved his ability to follow the foreign policy positions. The German liaison officer Waldemar Erfurth complained that Ramsay had bad relations with Germany. Ramsay instinctively tried to keep his distance with representatives of the Third Reich, because they were an obstacle to peace-making. However, he bore a great concern for food intake because he was a former minister of public maintenance and concerned about the sufficiency of food.

As a foreign minister he did not have the slightest difficulty to socialize with the U.S. chargé d'affaires. Similarly, his connections to Sweden were abundant.

The German requirement for a treaty between Germany and Finland was transformed into a letter from Risto Ryti to Adolf Hitler because of Ramsay's perseverance and the negotiations skills. Germany had finally obtained the Erklärung but only in a form which bound Ryti himself, not the country. Ramsay was sentenced to prison for 2.5 years (1946–1947) in the War-responsibility trials. He hardly appeared in public anymore following his release from prison.

=== After the war ===
Ramsay was the president and CEO of Finnish Steamship Corporation between 1920 and 1946 and again from 1948 to 1951. He was also the chairman of the board 1934-1946. He was the minister of public maintenance in Jukka Rangell's cabinet and the Minister of Foreign Affairs in the Edwin Linkomies' cabinet during the Continuation War 1943–1944.

He died of a sudden heart attack in Visby harbor in his own yacht cabin during a sailing trip. Henrik Ramsay bequeathed his beloved 8m yacht Regina to Marcus Wallenberg Jr.

Political offices
Preceded by Rolf Witting	Foreign Minister of Finland; 1943–1944	Succeeded by Carl Enckell
