= List of ship launches in 1911 =

The list of ship launches in 1911 includes a chronological list of some ships launched in 1911.

Date	Ship	Class / type	Builder	Location	Country	Notes
11 January	V187	S138-class torpedo boat	AG Vulcan	Stettin	Germany	
12 January	G194	S138-class torpedo boat	Germaniawerft	Kiel	Germany	
14 January	Arkansas	Wyoming-class battleship	New York Shipbuilding	Camden, New Jersey	United States	
28 January	Arthur Capel	Steamship	Forges et Chantiers de la Méditerranée	La Seyne	France	For: Soc. Anonyme des Transports Maritimes et Fluviaux
1 February	Thunderer	Orion-class battleship	Thames Iron Works	Leamouth, London	United Kingdom	
2 February	Faulx	Bouclier-class destroyer	Établissement de la Brosse et Fouché	Nantes	France	
2 February	Mariotte	Submarine	Arsenal de Cherbourg	Cherbourg	France	
6 February	Hirondelle	Steam yacht	Forges et Chantiers de la Méditerranée	La Seyne	France	For: S.A.S. le Prince de Monaco
8 February	V188	S138-class torpedo boat	AG Vulcan	Stettin	Germany	
25 February	Peking	barque	Blohm + Voss	Hamburg	Germany	For F. Laeisz
28 February	Demosthenes	Passenger ship	Harland & Wolff	Belfast	United Kingdom	For Aberdeen Line.
2 March	Rochambeau	Ocean liner	Ateliers et Chantiers de Saint-Nazaire Penhoët	Saint-Nazaire	France	
6 March	Alice	Steamship	Forges et Chantiers de la Méditerranée	La Seyne	France	For:Soc. Anonyme des Transports Maritimes et Fluviaux
14 March	V189	S138-class torpedo boat	AG Vulcan	Stettin	Germany	
14 March	Salta	Steamship	Forges et Chantiers de la Méditerranée	La Seyne	France	For: Soc. Générale de Transports Maritimes à Vapeur
14 March	U-8	U-5-type submarine	Germaniawerft	Kiel	Germany	For Imperial German Navy
22 March	Kaiser	Kaiser-class battleship	Naval Dockyard	Kiel	Germany	
28 March	Goeben	Moltke-class battlecruiser	Blohm + Voss	Hamburg	Germany	
30 March	Monarch	Orion-class battleship	Armstrong Whitworth	Elswick	United Kingdom	
1 April	Riviera	Ferry	William Denny and Brothers	Dumbarton	United Kingdom	For South Eastern and Chatham Railway.
8 April	G195	S138-class torpedo boat	Germaniawerft	Kiel	Germany	
12 April	Galway Castle	Passenger ship	Harland & Wolff	Belfast	United Kingdom	For Union-Castle Line.
12 April	V190	S138-class torpedo boat	AG Vulcan	Stettin	Germany	
13 April	Cimeterre	Bouclier-class destroyer	Forges et Chantiers de la Gironde	Bordeaux	France	
13 April	Dague	Bouclier-class destroyer	Forges et Chantiers de la Gironde	Bordeaux	France	
25 April	Nomadic	Tender	Harland & Wolff	Belfast	United Kingdom	For White Star Line.
27 April	Traffic	Tender	Harland & Wolff	Belfast	United Kingdom	For White Star Line.
29 April	Princess Royal	Lion-class battlecruiser	Vickers Limited	Barrow-in-Furness	United Kingdom	
29 April	Brumaire	Brumaire-class submarine	Arsenal de Cherbourg	Cherbourg	France	
1 May	Conqueror	Orion-class battleship	William Beardmore and Company	Dalmuir	United Kingdom	
2 May	Boutefeu	Bouclier-class destroyer	Dyle et Bacalan	Bordeaux	France	
12 May	Enseigne Henry	Spahi-class destroyer	Arsenal de Rochefort	Rochefort, Charente-Maritime	France	
13 May	Magdeburg	Magdeburg-class cruiser	AG Weser	Bremen	Germany	
16 May	Breslau	Magdeburg-class cruiser	AG Vulcan	Stettin	Germany	
25 May	Wyoming	Wyoming-class battleship	William Cramp & Sons	Philadelphia, Pennsylvania	United States	
25 May	G196	S138-class torpedo boat	Germaniawerft	Kiel	Germany	
29 May	Lobao	Coaster	I. J. Abdela & Mitchell Ltd.	Queensferry	United Kingdom	For A. Lobao.
29 May	Ville de Bordeaux	—	Forges et Chantiers de la Méditerranée	Le Havre	France	For: Cie. Havraise Péninsulaire de Navigation à Vapeur
31 May	Titanic	Olympic-class ocean liner	Harland and Wolff	Belfast	United Kingdom	For White Star Line.
1 June	Bernoulli	Brumaire-class submarine	Arsenal de Toulon	Toulon	France	
2 June	V191	S138-class torpedo boat	AG Vulcan	Stettin	Germany	
10 June	Friedrich der Grosse	Kaiser-class battleship	AG Vulcan	Stettin	Germany	
23 June	G197	S138-class torpedo boat	Germaniawerft	Kiel	Germany	
24 June	Viribus Unitis	Tegetthoff-class battleship	Stabilimento Tecnico Triestino	Trieste	Austria-Hungary	
27 June	Faraday	Brumaire-class submarine	Arsenal de Rochefort	Rochefort, Charente-Maritime	France	
29 June	Bouclier	Bouclier-class destroyer	Normand	Le Havre	France	
29 June	Zealandic	Passenger ship	Harland & Wolff	Belfast	United Kingdom	For White Star Line.
1 July	Col James Schoonmaker	Lake freighter			United States	
1 July	New Zealand	Indefatigable-class battlecruiser	Fairfield Shipping and Engineering	Govan	United Kingdom	
5 July	N.E.R. No. 14	Hopper barge	Blyth Shipbuilding & Dry Docks Co. Ltd	Blyth	United Kingdom	For North Eastern Railway.
25 July	Duchess of Norfolk	Paddle steamer	D & W Henderson	Glasgow	United Kingdom	For London, Brighton and South Coast Railway and London and South Western Railway.
27 July	Laconia	Ocean liner	Swan Hunter & Wigham Richardson	Wallsend	United Kingdom	
29 July	Richard Waddington	Pilot boat	Forges et Chantiers de la Méditerranée	Le Havre	France	For: Pilotes de la Seine
10 August	Conte di Cavour	Conte di Cavour-class battleship	La Spezia Naval Base	La Spezia	Italy	
10 August	N.E.R. No. 15	Hopper barge	Blyth Shipbuilding & Dry Docks Co. Ltd	Blyth	United Kingdom	For North Eastern Railway.
11 August	Guildford Castle	Ocean Liner	Barclay Curle	Glasgow	United Kingdom	For Union-Castle Line
12 August	Canada	Steamship	Forges et Chantiers de la Méditerranée	La Seyne	France	For: Cie. Française de Navigation à Vapeur
24 August	Strassburg	Magdeburg-class cruiser	Kaiserliche Werft	Wilhelmshaven	Germany	
26 August	Frimaire	Brumaire-class submarine	Arsenal de Cherbourg	Cherbourg	France	
7 September	Joule	Brumaire-class submarine	Arsenal de Toulon	Toulon	France	
11 September	V1	V1-class torpedo boat	AG Vulcan	Stettin	German Empire	
12 September	Transporter	Cargo ship	Blyth Shipbuilding & Dry Docks Co. Ltd	Blyth	United Kingdom	For Tyneside Line Ltd.
20 September	Passat	Flying P-Liner	Blohm + Voss	Hamburg	Germany	For F. Laeisz
22 September	Jean Bart	Courbet-class battleship	Arsenal de Brest	Brest	France	
23 September	Courbet	Courbet-class battleship	Arsenal de Lorient	Lorient	France	
23 September	Engadine	Ferry	William Denny and Brothers	Dumbarton	United Kingdom	For South Eastern and Chatham Railway.
23 September	Volta	Brumaire-class submarine	Arsenal de Rochefort	Rochefort, Charente-Maritime	France	
27 September	Patriotic	Ferry	Harland & Wolff	Belfast	United Kingdom	For Belfast Steamship Co.
7 October	City of Detroit III	Paddle steamer	Detroit Shipbuilding Company	Wyandotte, Michigan	United States	
9 October	King George V	King George V-class battleship	Portsmouth Dockyard	Portsmouth	United Kingdom	
14 October	Leonardo da Vinci	Conte di Cavour-class battleship	Odero Shipbuilding Co.	Sestri Ponente, Genoa	Italy	
14 October	V2	V1-class torpedo boat	AG Vulcan	Stettin	Germany	
15 October	Giulio Cesare	Conte di Cavour-class battleship	Gio. Ansaldo & C.	Genoa	Italy	
21 October	Crayford	type	Blyth Shipbuilding & Dry Docks Co. Ltd	Blyth	United Kingdom	For William Cory & Son Ltd.
25 October	Australia	Indefatigable-class battlecruiser	John Brown and Company	Clydebank	United Kingdom	
26 October	Deseado	Passenger ship	Harland & Wolff	Belfast	United Kingdom	For Royal Mail Line.
4 November	Selandia	Cargo liner	Burmeister & Wain	Copenhagen, Denmark	Denmark	Diesel powered
4 November	Stralsund	Magdeburg-class cruiser	AG Weser	Bremen	Germany	
7 November	Talthybius	Cargo liner	Scotts Shipbuilding & Engineering Co Ltd	Greenock	United Kingdom	For Ocean Steamship Co Ltd
7 November	G7	V1-class torpedo boat	Germaniawerft	Kiel	Germany	
8 November	Princess Sophia	Coastal passenger steamship	Bow, McLachlan and Company	Paisley	United Kingdom	
9 November	Dublin	Town-class cruiser	William Beardmore and Company	Dalmuir	United Kingdom	
9 November	Chatham	Town-class cruiser	Chatham Dockyard	Chatham	United Kingdom	
11 November	Kaiserin	Kaiser-class battleship	Howaldtswerke	Kiel	Germany	
14 November	Médie	Steamship	Forges et Chantiers de la Méditerranée	La Seyne	France	For: N. Paquet
15 November	V3	V1-class torpedo boat	AG Vulcan	Stettin	Germany	
18 November	Centurion	King George V-class battleship	Devonport Dockyard	Devonport	United Kingdom	
21 November	Eugéne Potron	—	Forges et Chantiers de la Méditerranée	Le Havre	France	For: Adminstration des Ponts et Chaussées (Departement du Finistere pour Port de Brest)
23 November	Arlanza	Passenger ship	Harland & Wolff	Belfast	United Kingdom	For Royal Mail Line.
6 December	Îsâ Reis	Gunboat	Forges et Chantiers de la Méditerranée	Le Havre	France	For the Ottoman Navy.
9 December	Ville d'Oran	—	Forges et Chantiers de la Méditerranée	Le Havre	France	For: Cie. Havraise Péninsulaire de Navigation à Vapeur
14 December	Deptford	Collier	Blyth Shipbuilding & Dry Docks Co. Ltd	Blyth	United Kingdom	For William Cory & Son Ltd.
21 December	G8	V1-class torpedo boat	Germaniawerft	Kiel	Germany	
21 December	Demerara	Passenger ship	Harland & Wolff	Belfast	United Kingdom	For Royal Mail Line.
23 December	V4	V1-class torpedo boat	AG Vulcan	Stettin	Germany	
Date unknown	C. & E. W.	Steam drifter	Beeching Brothers Ltd.	Great Yarmouth	United Kingdom	For Charles A. Webster.
Date unknown	Clifford	Sloop	Brown & Clapson	Barton-upon-Humber	United Kingdom	For Markham & Co. Ltd.
Date unknown	Cod	Barge	I. J. Abdela & Mitchell Ltd.	Queensferry	United Kingdom	For Rea Transport Co. Ltd.
Date unknown	E.E.S.	Steam drifter	Beeching Brothers Ltd.	Great Yarmouth	United Kingdom	For Richard Sutton.
Date unknown	Galilean	Steam drifter	Beeching Brothers Ltd.	Great Yarmouth	United Kingdom	For Sidney Burroughs.
Date unknown	Glory	Lighter	Brown & Clapson	Barton-upon-Humber	United Kingdom	For private owner.
Date unknown	Herring Queen	Steam drifter	Beeching Brothers Ltd.	Great Yarmouth	United Kingdom	For Great Yarmouth Steam Drifters Ltd.
Date unknown	J.S.	Steam drifter	Beeching Brothers Ltd.	Great Yarmouth	United Kingdom	For James Powley.
Date unknown	Laura	Tug	I. J. Abdela & Mitchell Ltd.	Queensferry	United Kingdom	For private owner.
Date unknown	Ocean Foam	Steam drifter	Beeching Brothers Ltd.	Great Yarmouth	United Kingdom	For Bloomfields Ltd.
Date unknown	Ocean Warrior	Steam drifter	Beeching Brothers Ltd.	Great Yarmouth	United Kingdom	For Bloomfields Ltd.
Date unknown	Oyster	Barge	I. J. Abdela & Mitchell Ltd.	Queensferry	United Kingdom	For Rea Transport Co. Ltd.
Date unknown	Plaice	Barge	I. J. Abdela & Mitchell Ltd.	Queensferry	United Kingdom	For Rea Transport Co. Ltd.
Date unknown	Rona	Lighter	Brown & Clapson	Barton-upon-Humber	United Kingdom	For Robert Lancaster.
Date unknown	Rosalie Stamp	Sloop	Brown & Clapson	Barton-upon-Humber	United Kingdom	For William Stamp.
Date unknown	Rothley	Cargo ship	Blyth Shipbuilding & Dry Docks Co. Ltd	Blyth	United Kingdom	For Red 'R' Steamship Co. Ltd.
Date unknown	Santora	Steam fishing vessel	Beeching Brothers Ltd.	Great Yarmouth	United Kingdom	For J. S. Johnston & Sons Ltd.
Date unknown	Sole	Barge	I. J. Abdela & Mitchell Ltd.	Queensferry	United Kingdom	For Rea Transport Co. Ltd.
Date unknown	Waimana	Cargo ship	Workman, Clark & Co. Ltd.	Belfast	United Kingdom	For Shaw, Savill & Albion Ltd.
Date unknown	Watchful	Steam ketch	Hall, Russell & Co. Ltd.	Aberdeen	United Kingdom	For Ministry of Finance and Customs, Government of Newfoundland.
Date unknown	Unnamed	Motor launch	I. J. Abdela & Mitchell Ltd.	Queensferry	United Kingdom	For private owner.
Date unknown	Unnamed	Motor launch	I. J. Abdela & Mitchell Ltd.	Queensferry	United Kingdom	For private owner.
Date unknown	Unnamed	Motor launch	I. J. Abdela & Mitchell Ltd.	Queensferry	United Kingdom	For private owner.
Date unknown	Unnamed	Motor launch	I. J. Abdela & Mitchell Ltd.	Queensferry	United Kingdom	For private owner.
