= Iron-hulled sailing ship =

Late 19th and early 20th century ships

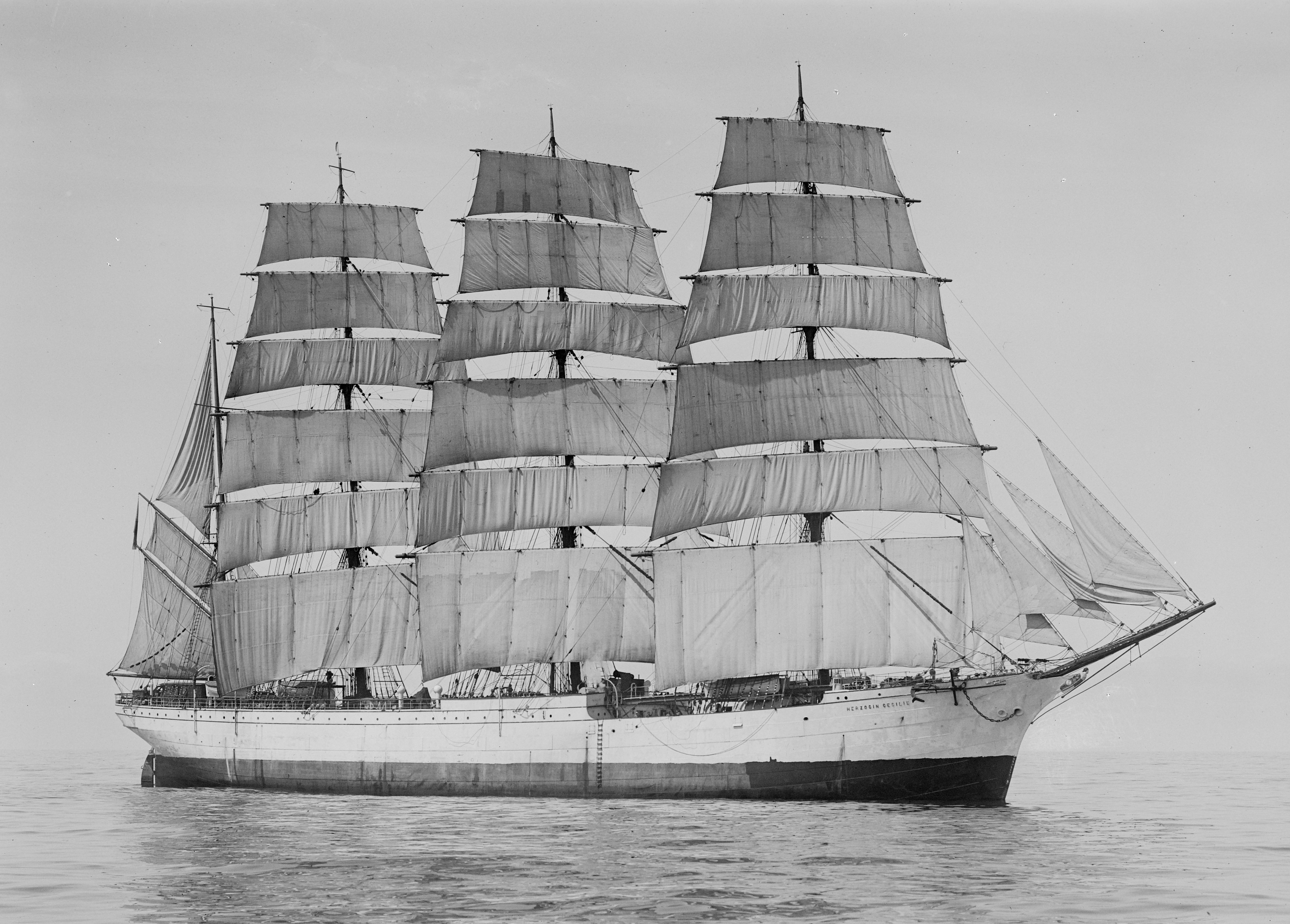
Four-masted, iron-hulled barque Herzogin Cecilie

Iron-hulled sailing ships represented the final evolution of sailing ships at the end of the Age of Sail. They were built to carry bulk cargo for long distances in the nineteenth and early twentieth centuries. They were the largest of merchant sailing ships, with three to five masts and square sails, as well as other sail plans. They carried lumber, guano, grain or ore between continents. Later examples had steel hulls. They are sometimes referred to as "windjammers" or "tall ships". Several survive, variously operating as school ships, museum ships, restaurant ships, and cruise ships.

== History ==
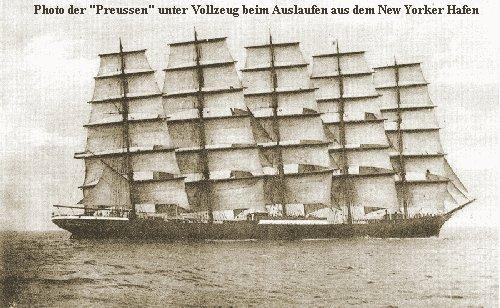
The five-masted Preussen was the largest ship-rigged sailing ship ever built, measuring 5,081 GRT.

Iron-hulled sailing ships were mainly built from the 1870s to 1900, when steamships began to outpace them economically, due to their ability to keep a schedule regardless of the wind. Steel hulls started to become common from 1885, providing an even greater strength to weight ratio. Even into the twentieth century, sailing ships could hold their own on ultra-long voyages such as Australia to Europe, since they did not require bunkerage for coal nor freshwater for steam, and they were faster than steamers, which usually could barely make 8 knots (15 km/h). Many sailed under the Finnish flag during at least some part of their careers. Ship-owner Gustaf Erikson of Mariehamn, Åland, Finland, was noted for his fleet during the interwar period. Other sailing ship companies carrying on despite the onset of the machine age were F. Laeisz of Hamburg and A.D. Bordes of Dunkirk.

The four-masted, iron-hulled ship, introduced in 1875 with the full-rigged County of Peebles, represented an especially efficient configuration that prolonged the competitiveness of sail against steam in the later part of the 19th century. The largest example of such ships was the five-masted full-rigged ship Preussen, which had a load capacity of 7,800 tons. She was also one of the fastest, regularly logging 16 knots (30 km/h) average speed on transatlantic voyages. Unfortunately speed was her undoing, as she collided with a steamer that underestimated the speed of the Preussen when crossing before her. The second-largest example was France II.

== Design ==
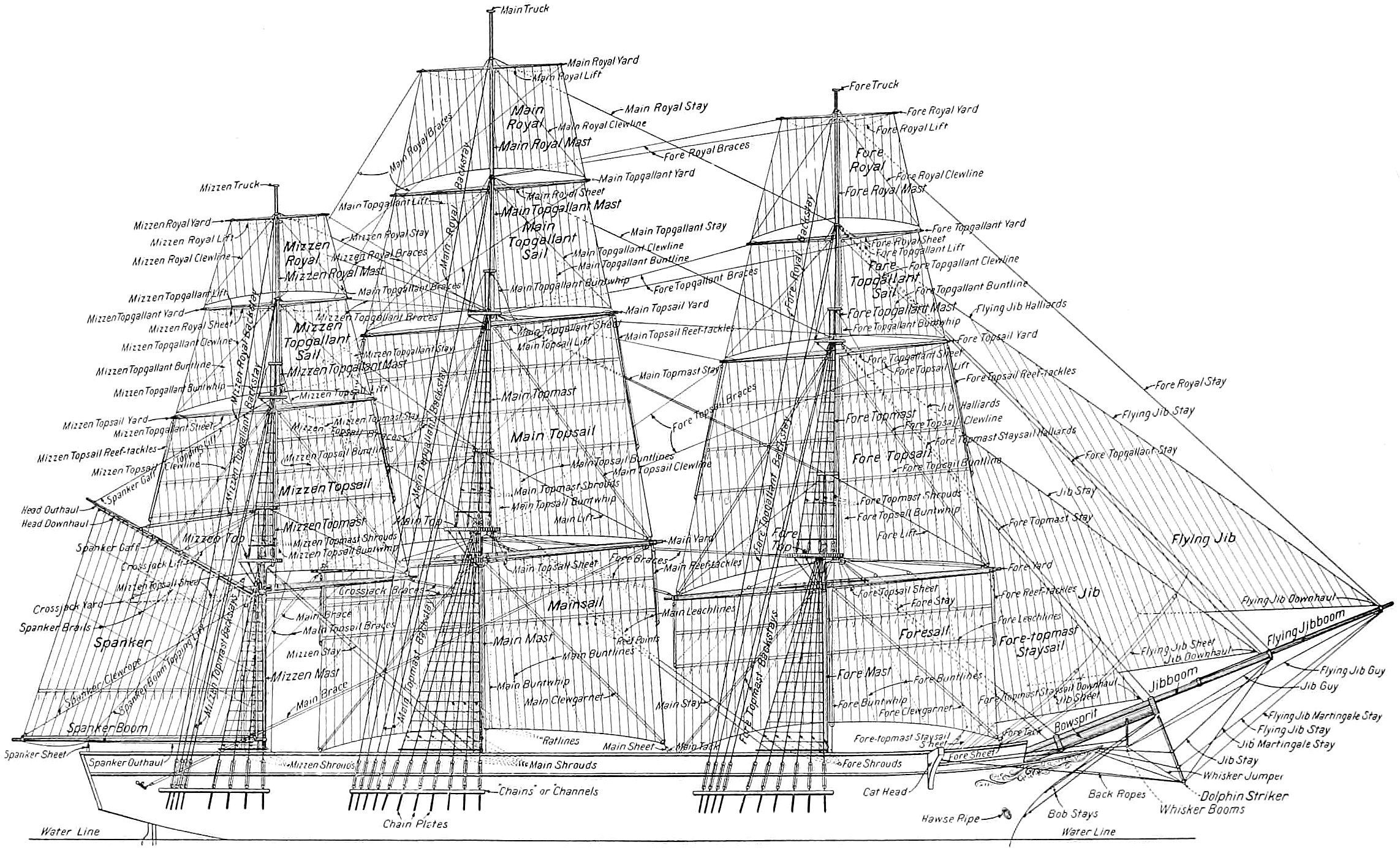
Diagram of rigging and sails on a full-rigged ship, ca. 1905

The last large commercial sailing vessels, designed well after the Industrial Revolution, used engineered iron and steel in their construction. In general, the ships displaced between 2,000 and 5,000 tons and were cheaper than their wooden-hulled counterparts for three main reasons: (1) iron was stronger and enabled larger ship size, capable of delivering considerable economies of scale, (2) iron hulls took up less space, allowing more room for cargo in a given hull size, and (3) iron required less maintenance than a wooden hull.

The large sail plans and raked bows of these vessels invite confusion with clippers, but there are significant differences. Clippers were optimized for speed, these vessels were optimized for cargo capacity and ease of handling. Most clippers were of composite construction (iron structure, wooden planking), full rigged and had a cargo capacity of less than 1,000 tonnes; these vessels were iron and steel hulled, usually barque rigged, and had far greater cargo capacities. Clippers had already begun to disappear when these vessels emerged.

Typically, such vessels were equipped with steel masts and yards and steel cables, where possible. Often the running rigging was handled by motor-driven winches powered by donkey engines. The combination of a large, efficient sail plan and hydrodynamic hull allowed these sailing ships to sustain high cruising speeds; most four-masted barques were able to cruise at 15 knots (28 km/h) with favorable winds. Some logged 18 knots (33 km/h) regularly and Herzogin Cecilie is known to have logged 21 knots (39 km/h).

== Crew ==
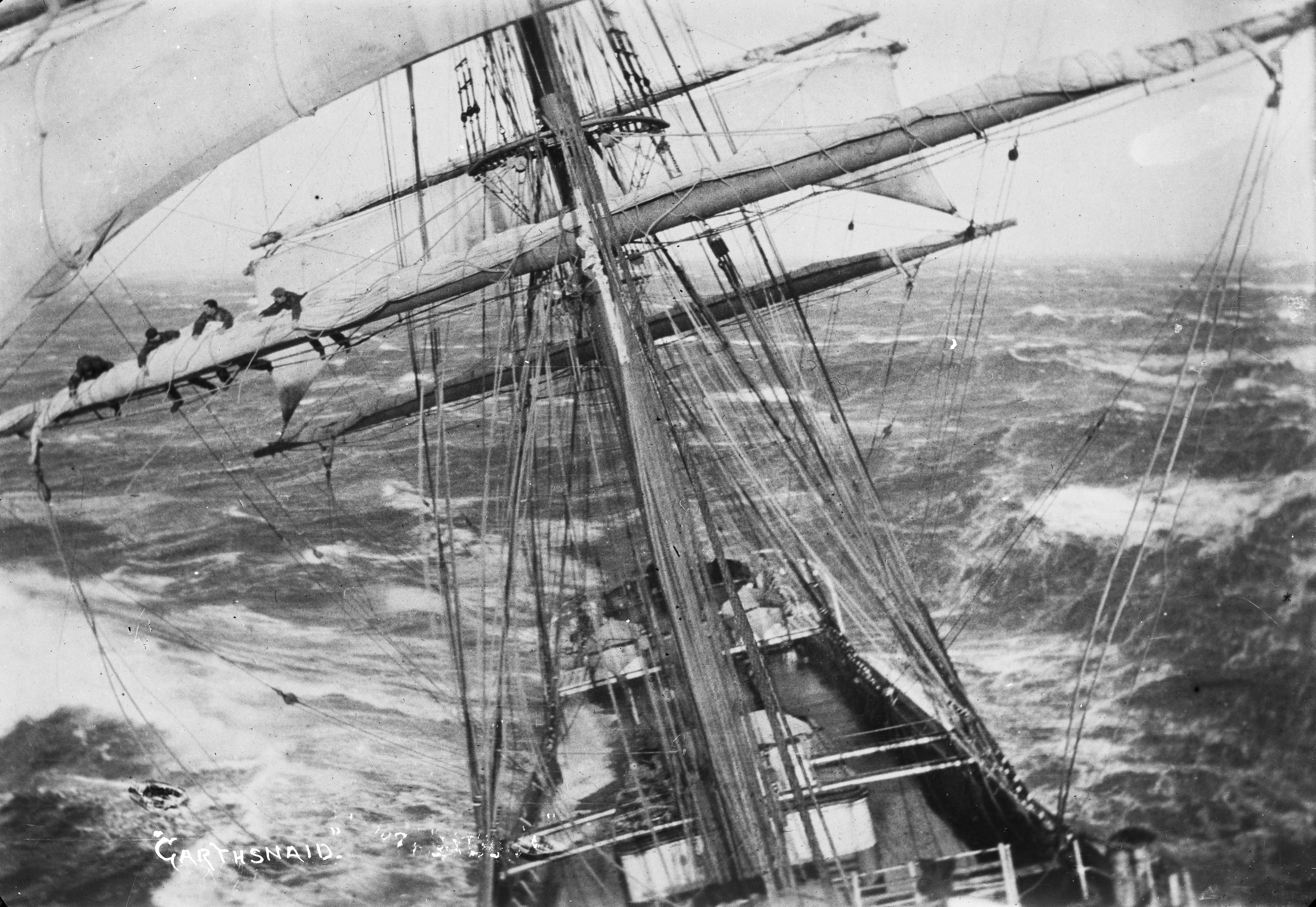
Crew of the ship Garthsnaid at sea, ca. 1920, securing a section of the foresail.

A sailing ship from this era could have a crew of as few as 14, with a typical crew being master, mate, boatswain (bosun), 15 seamen and 5 apprentices. Herzogin Cecilie in 1926 sailed around Cape Horn with "only 19 men aboard, although not from choice." The crew roster of Pamir on her last commercial voyage around Cape Horn in 1949 under the Finnish flag listed a total complement of 33:

- The master
- 4 officers (1st, 2nd, 3rd mate and bosun)
- 13 able seamen
- 5 Ordinary seamen
- 5 deckboys
- 4 cook/assistant cook and steward/assistant steward
- 1 donkeyman (mechanic)

Owners ran their sailing ships with close attention to costs. Officers and essential skilled crew, such as sailmakers, were still paid poorly: the captain of Moshulu in 1938 received about $100/month and the average sailmaker about $20/month. "The wages of other crew members were minuscule. A skilled able seaman (rated as an A.B.) received not more than, and often much less than, sixteen dollars per month." Crews were readily available in spite of abysmal pay because Germany and Scandinavian countries still required sail experience for mariner's licences.

Discipline, at the end of the 19th century, "especially on American sailing ships, could be brutal, often unnecessarily so." As the end of the sailing ship era drew near by the 1930s, "such tactics had pretty much disappeared in the Finnish ships [and] in the ... German ships." However, even the Finnish mates occasionally enforced discipline with their fists while sailing with minimal crews of largely inexperienced youths when "... instant obedience to orders was essential."

== Economics ==
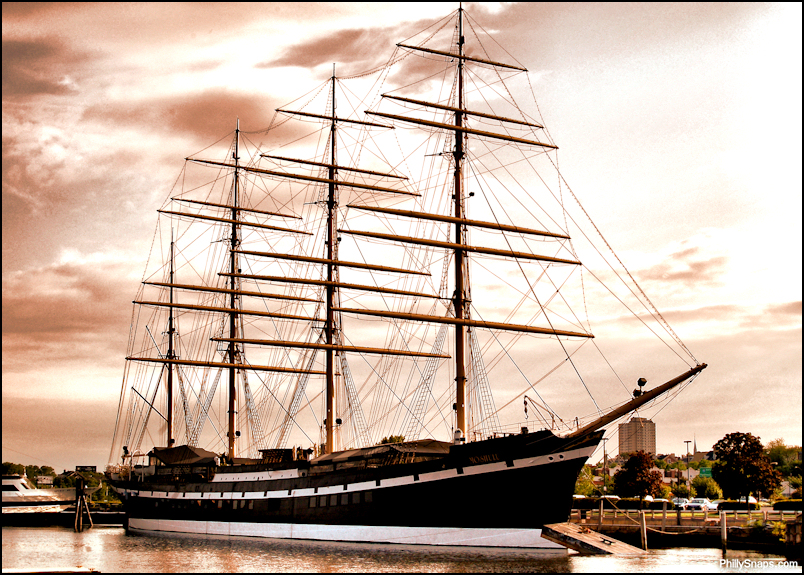
The largest sailing ship to survive, the four-masted barque Moshulu at Philadelphia, Pennsylvania, United States

Though a fast-disappearing breed by the 1920s, sailing ships were used commercially until the 1950s. They occupied a niche in the transport of low-value bulk cargoes of little interest to steamship companies, e.g., lumber, coal, guano or grain (60,000 sacks on Pamir). Cargoes were carried from remote ports, with fuel and water unavailable, such as Australia (carrying wool or grain), remote Pacific islands (guano) and South America (nitrates). These vessels usually followed the clipper route around the world, ideally carrying different cargoes on each leg of their route, but most frequently sailing in ballast. The last leg from Australia to Europe, where the cargo was wheat or barley, became the source of The Great Grain Races as the ships' masters attempted to sail the leg as fast as possible, essentially only for prestige and pride — usually from the grain ports of South Australia's Spencer Gulf to Lizard Point at the Cornwall coast and on to the harbour of destination in Britain or continental Europe.

In the 1930s 'good money' could be made in the grain trade from Australia to Europe, "the carrying rates could vary from perhaps four dollars to eight dollars per ton." The owners of the Parma bought their vessel in 1932 for about ten thousand dollars and then loaded over 5,200 tons or 62,650 sacks of grain, for a gross income of $40,000. "The ship paid for herself and all her expenses for the year from the income of that one voyage even though she had sailed in ballast halfway around the world." In most of those years, the ships in the grain trade could clear about $5,000 each.

The Germans in particular maintained profitable commerce through the 1930s to the west coast of South America, shipping general cargo out and nitrates home. They had built powerful vessels, such as the Peking, Padua and Priwall especially for the difficult west-bound voyage around Cape Horn, and their captains were expected to make three round trips around the Horn over a two-year period.

Despite the cost, some of the ships used the Panama Canal, towed by tugs the entire course, avoiding the Horn.

== Remaining ships ==
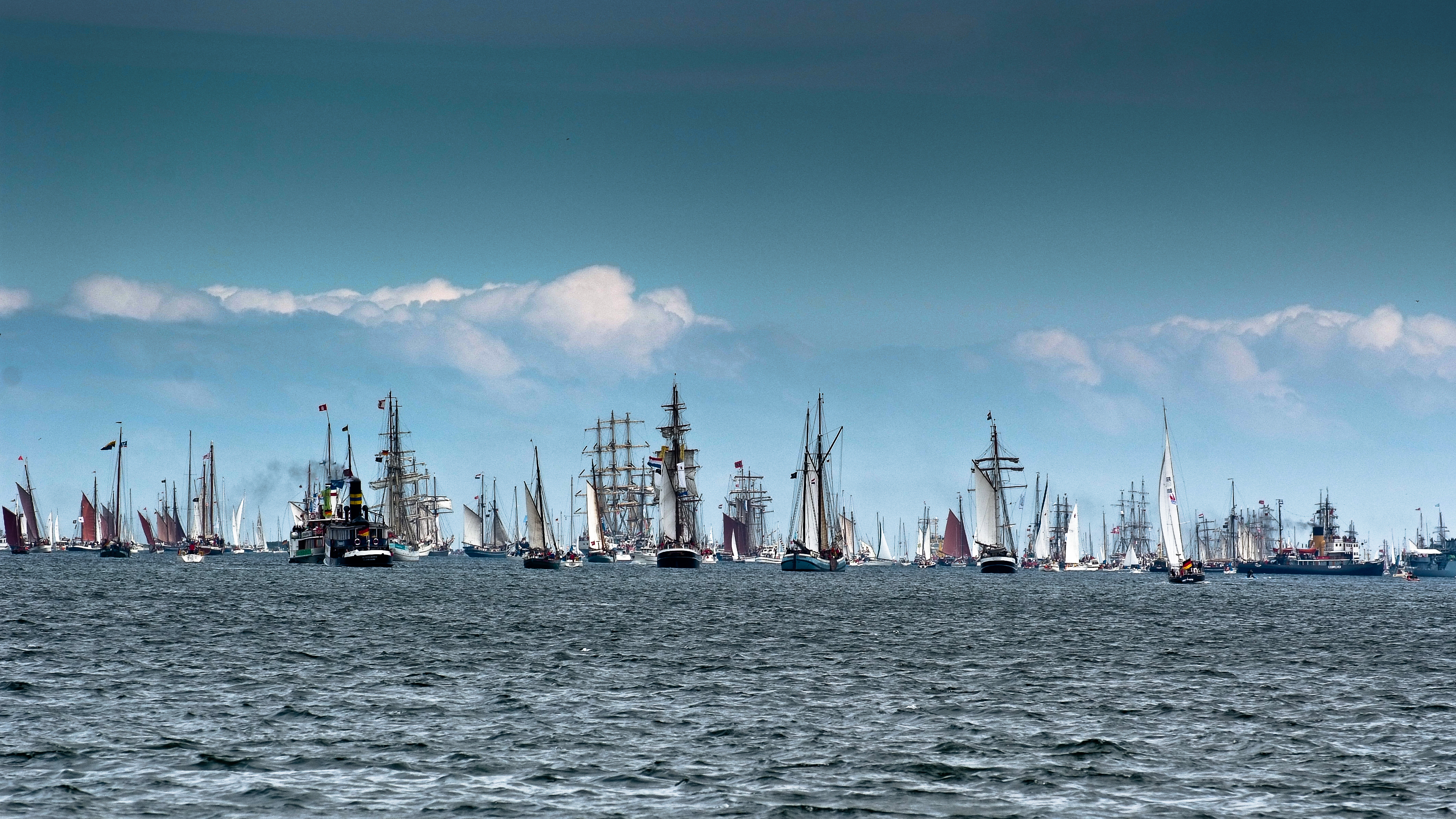
Tall ships parade at Kiel Week in Germany, the world's biggest regatta and sailing event

A few such tall ships can still be seen at international maritime events such as SAIL Amsterdam, the Kiel Week and Hanse Sail.

The largest remaining original sailing ship is the four-masted barque Moshulu, today a restaurant ship moored in Philadelphia, Pennsylvania, United States. The largest sailing ship still in service is a Russian school ship, the four-masted barque STS Sedov. The last metal-hulled sailing ship in original layout is the Pommern, today a museum ship at Mariehamn.

Remaining iron-hulled ships include:

- Elissa
- Star of India
- Wavertree
- Joseph Conrad
- James Craig
- Polly Woodside

Remaining steel-hulled ships include:

- Balclutha
- Glenlee
- Moshulu
- Pommern
- Passat
- Peking
- Kruzenshtern
- STS Sedov
- Viking
- Suomen Joutsen
- af Chapman
- Rickmer Rickmers
- Belem

== See also ==
- Barque
- Grain race
- List of large sailing vessels
- Tall ship
- Windjammer
