= Preussen (ship) =

German ship built in 1902

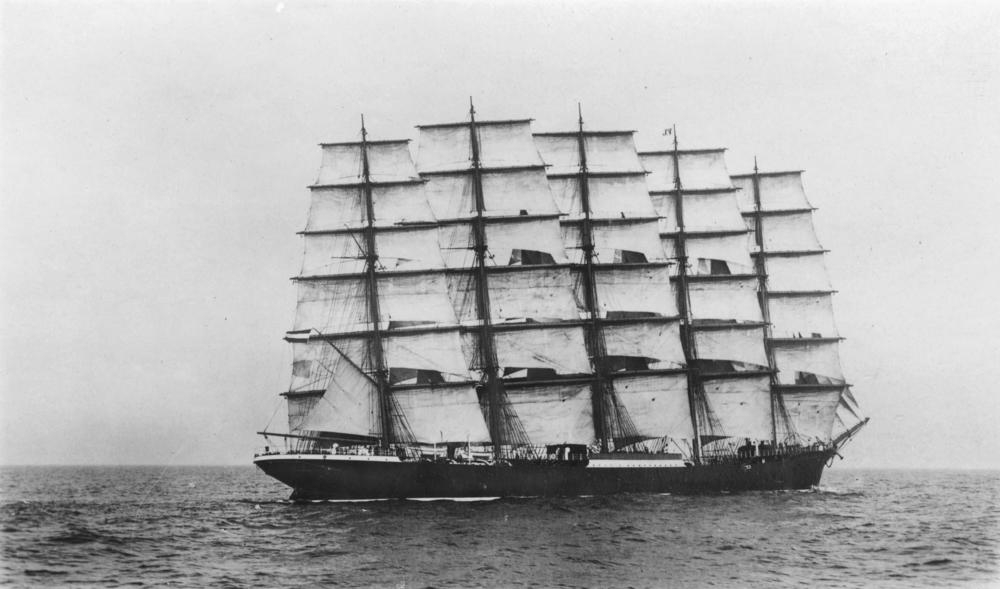
- Preussen under full sail

History

German Empire
- Name: Preußen
- Namesake: State and Kingdom of Prussia (Preußen)
- Owner: F. Laeisz Shipping Company
- Route: Hamburg-Chile (12 journeys); 1 journey round the world in charter to Standard Oil Co.
- Ordered: November, 1900
- Builder: Joh. C. Tecklenborg Shipyard, Geestemünde; Naval architect: Dr. h.c. Georg W. Claussen
- Cost: M 1,200,000 (About US$300,000 then)
- Yard number: 179
- Laid down: August 1901
- Launched: 7 May 1902 and christened the same day
- Completed: 7 July 1902
- Commissioned: 10 July 1902
- Maiden voyage: 31 July 1902 to Iquique, Chile in 64 days
- Home port: Hamburg, Germany
- Identification: code letters RMPT:
- Fate: Wrecked near Dover on 6 November 1910, no loss of men
- Badge: None; no figurehead, a volute instead

General characteristics
- Class & type: five-masted full-rigged steel ship; nitrate carrier, bulk carrier
- Tonnage: 5,081 GRT; 4,788 NRT; 8,000 DWT
- Displacement: 11,150 long tons (11,330 t) (at 8,000 long tons or 8,100 metric tons load)
- Length: 482 ft (147 m) (overall); 439.6 ft (134.0 m) (hull); 400.3 ft (122.0 m) (btw. perpendiculars)
- Beam: 53.8 ft (16.4 m)
- Height: 223.1 ft (68.0 m) (keel to masthead truck); 190.28 ft (58.00 m) (deck to masthead truck)
- Draft: 27.09 ft (8.26 m)
- Depth: 33.59 ft (10.24 m) (depth molded)
- Depth of hold: 32.48 ft (9.90 m)
- Decks: 2 continuous steel, poop, forecastle, and midship island (bridge) decks
- Deck clearance: 8 ft (2.4 m)
- Installed power: no auxiliary propulsion; 2 donkey engines for sail winches, loading gear, pumps, generator
- Propulsion: sail
- Sail plan: 47 sails: 30 square sails; 17 fore-and-aft sails: 12 staysails, 4 foresails, 1 spanker; sail area: 6,806 m^{2} (73,260 sq ft)
- Speed: 20.5 knots (38.0 km/h)
- Boats & landing craft carried: 4 lifeboats on the aft main deck
- Complement: 45, 49 max.
- Crew: captain, 1st, 2nd, & 3rd mates, steward, cook, sailmaker, 38 to 42 able seamen and shipboys
- Notes: small surgery, Jarvis patent brace winches for each mast

Preussen (Preußen in German and as written on the vessel) ([ˈpʁɔʏsn̩]) was a German steel-hulled, five-masted, ship-rigged sailing ship built in 1902 for the F. Laeisz shipping company and named after the German state and kingdom of Prussia. She was the world's only ship of this class with five masts, carrying six square sails on each mast.

Until the 2000 launch of Royal Clipper, a sail cruise liner, she was the only five-masted full-rigged ship ever built.

== History ==
Preussen was built as hull-number 179 at the Joh. C. Tecklenborg ship yard in Geestemünde according to the plans of chief designer Dr.-Ing. h. c. Georg Wilhelm Claussen, launched and christened on 7 May 1902. The ship was commissioned on 31 July 1902 and left the harbour of Bremerhaven the same day on her maiden voyage to Iquique under the command of Capt. Boye Richard Petersen who assisted naval architect Claussen in his plans. The concept was to build a five-masted, full-rigged ship as an extension of the existing five-masted steel barque design, e.g. Potosi . The initial construction plans were found among the effects of Carl Ferdinand Laeisz, grandson of founder Ferdinand Laeisz and son of C. H. Laeisz, who died in 1900, at age of 48.

The sturdily built ship could withstand heavy weather and was able to tack in force 9 winds. In such conditions eight men had to hold the 6 1/2-foot-tall (2.0 m) double steering wheel. She was successfully used in the saltpeter trade with Chile, setting speed records in the process. Due to her appearance, uniqueness, and excellent sailing characteristics seamen called her the "Queen of the Queens of the Seas". In 1903, she sailed an unequalled record voyage from Lizard Point to Iquique in 57 days. She made twelve "round trips" (Hamburg–Chile and back home) and one journey round the world via New York and Yokohama, Japan in charter to the Standard Oil Co. When she entered New York harbour, almost all New Yorkers were "on their legs" to see and welcome that unique tall sailing ship. Capt. B. R. Petersen was accompanied by his wife and his little son; both left the ship and returned to Hamburg later by steamer. The mighty Preussen, as she was named by many seamen, had only two skippers in her career, Captain Boye Richard Petersen (11 voyages) and Captain Jochim Hans Hinrich Nissen (2 full voyages and the last). Both masters learned and developed their skills sailing such a huge sailing ship under Capt. Robert Hilgendorf, late master of Potosí.

=== Loss ===
On 5 November 1910, on her 14th outbound voyage, carrying a mixed cargo including a number of pianos for Chile, Preussen was at 23:35 rammed by the small British cross-channel steamer Brighton 8 nautical miles (15 km) south of Newhaven. Contrary to regulations, Brighton had tried to cross her bows, underestimating her high speed of 16 knots (30 km/h). Preussen was seriously damaged and lost much of her forward rigging (bowsprit, fore topgallant mast), making it impossible to steer the ship to safety. Brighton returned to Newhaven to summon aid and the tug Alert was sent to assist Preussen. A November gale thwarted attempts to sail or tug her to safety in Dover Harbour. It was intended to anchor her off Dover, but both anchor chains broke, and Preussen was driven onto rocks at Crab Bay, where she sank as a result of the damage inflicted on her. While crew, cargo and some equipment could be saved from Preussen, with the keel broken she was rendered unsalvageable. She sits in 6 metres (3.3 fathoms) of water at 51°8.02′N 1°22.17′E. The Master of Brighton was found to be responsible for the accident and lost his licence as a result. A few ribs of Preussen can be seen off Crab Bay at low spring tides.

== Technical data ==
Preussen was steel-built with a waterline length of 124 m and a total hull length of 132 m. The hull was 16.4 m wide and the ship had a displacement of 11,150 long tons (11,330 t), for an effective carrying capacity of 8,000 long tons (8,100 t).

The five masts were fully rigged, with courses, upper and lower topsails, upper and lower topgallant sails, and royals. Counting staysails, she carried 47 sails (30 square sails in six storeys, 12 staysails between the five masts, four foresails (jibs) and a small fore-and-aft spanker) with a total sail area of 6,806 square meters (73,260 sq ft) (according to other sources 5,560 square meters (59,800 sq ft), which probably refer to the square sail area only). Not only the hull was steel: masts (lower and top mast were made in one piece) and spars (yard, spanker boom) were constructed of steel tubing, and most of the rigging was steel cable. All bobstays between jibboom and bow were made of massive steel rods and chains. The only wooden spar was the gaff of the small spanker. The hoistable yards were equipped with special shoes to slide in rails riveted to the masts. "Jarvis' Patent" brace winches for the lower and top-sail yards were mounted before each of the five masts. The fall winches were of "Hall's Patent".

The names of the five masts were Fockmast, Grossmast, Mittelmast, Laeiszmast (after her owner), Kreuzmast.

She was designed as a so-called "three-island ship", i. e. a ship with a third "high level deck" amidships beside the forecastle (41 ft (12 m)) and poop (65 ft (20 m)) decks. The midship island (74 ft (23 m)), also called the midship bridge, is also called a "Liverpool house", because the first ships equipped with that feature came from Liverpool yards. Dry and well-ventilated accommodations for crew, mates, and captain, as well as the pantry and chart room, were built in this middle deck. The main helm — a double rudder wheel of 6.2 ft (1.89 m) diameter with a steam driven rudder machine — was mounted on top of it, well protected against the dangerous huge waves from aft. A second helm (emergency helm) was near the stern. Four huge main hatches were set in the upper main deck. Behind the foremast a little deckhouse contained the two donkey boilers that drove four steam winches, a steam capstan, the rudder machine, and a generator for electricity. Four lifeboats with davits were securely fixed on a tubing rack above the main deck before the aftmost mast.

Under good conditions, the ship could reach a speed of 20 knots (37 km/h). Her best 24-hour runs were 392 nm in 1908 on her voyage to Japan and 426 nm in 1904 in the South Pacific. Preussen was manned by a crew of 45, which was supported by two steam engines powering the pumps, the rudder steering engine, the loading gear, and winches. English seamen estimate her the fastest sailing ship after the clipper era, even faster than her fleet sister Potosí. Only a few clippers were faster than Preussen, and they had considerably less cargo capacity.

== Gallery ==
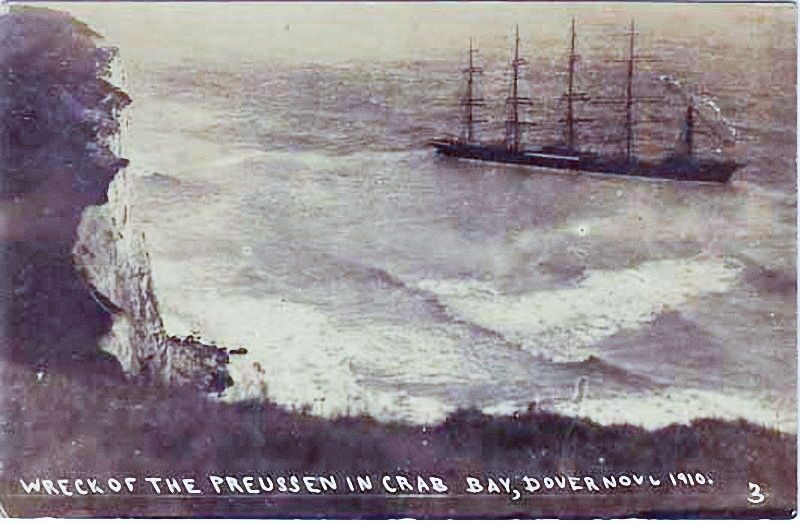
Preussen, stranded in Crab Bay

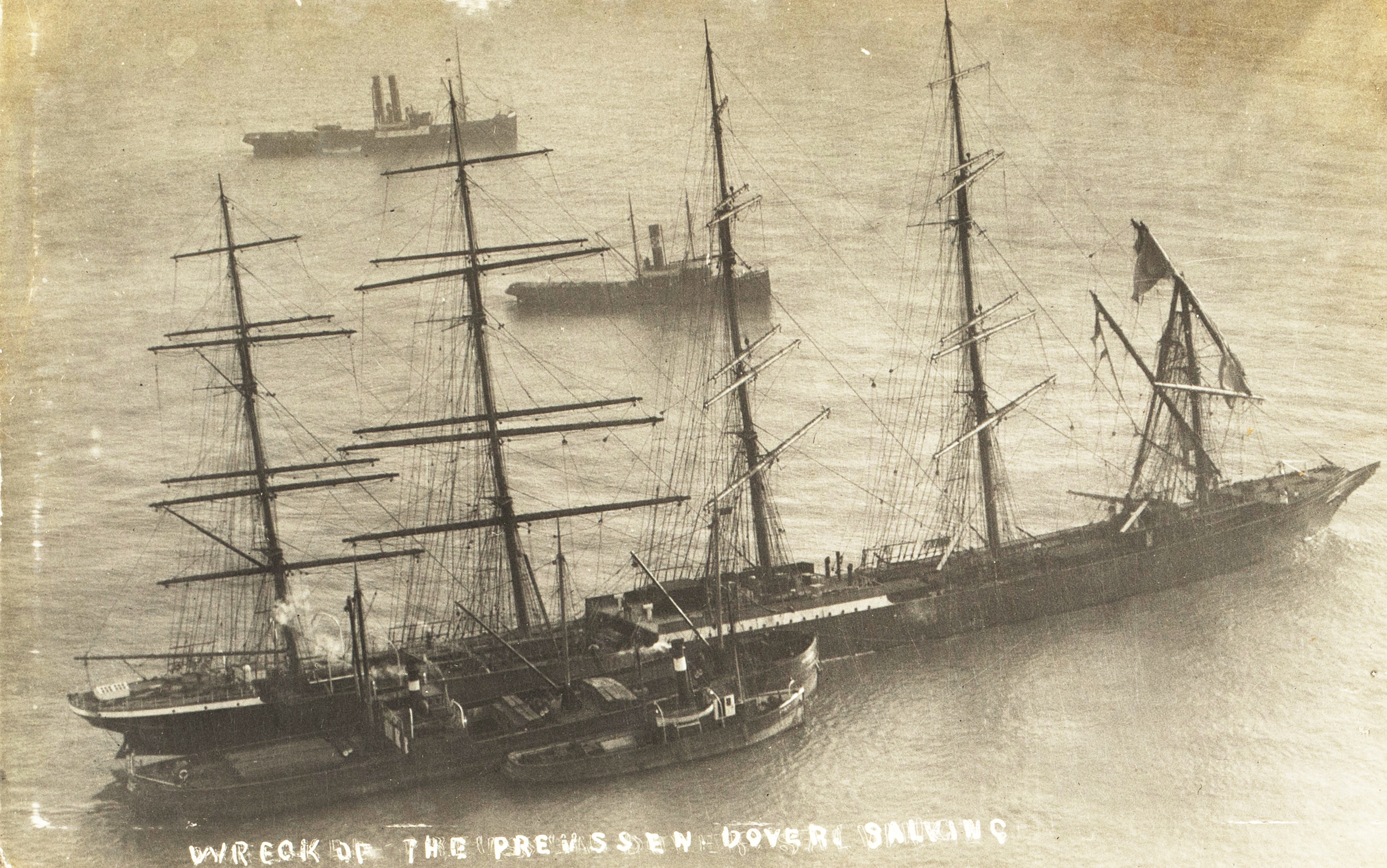
Preussen with tugs, Crab Bay, England, 1910

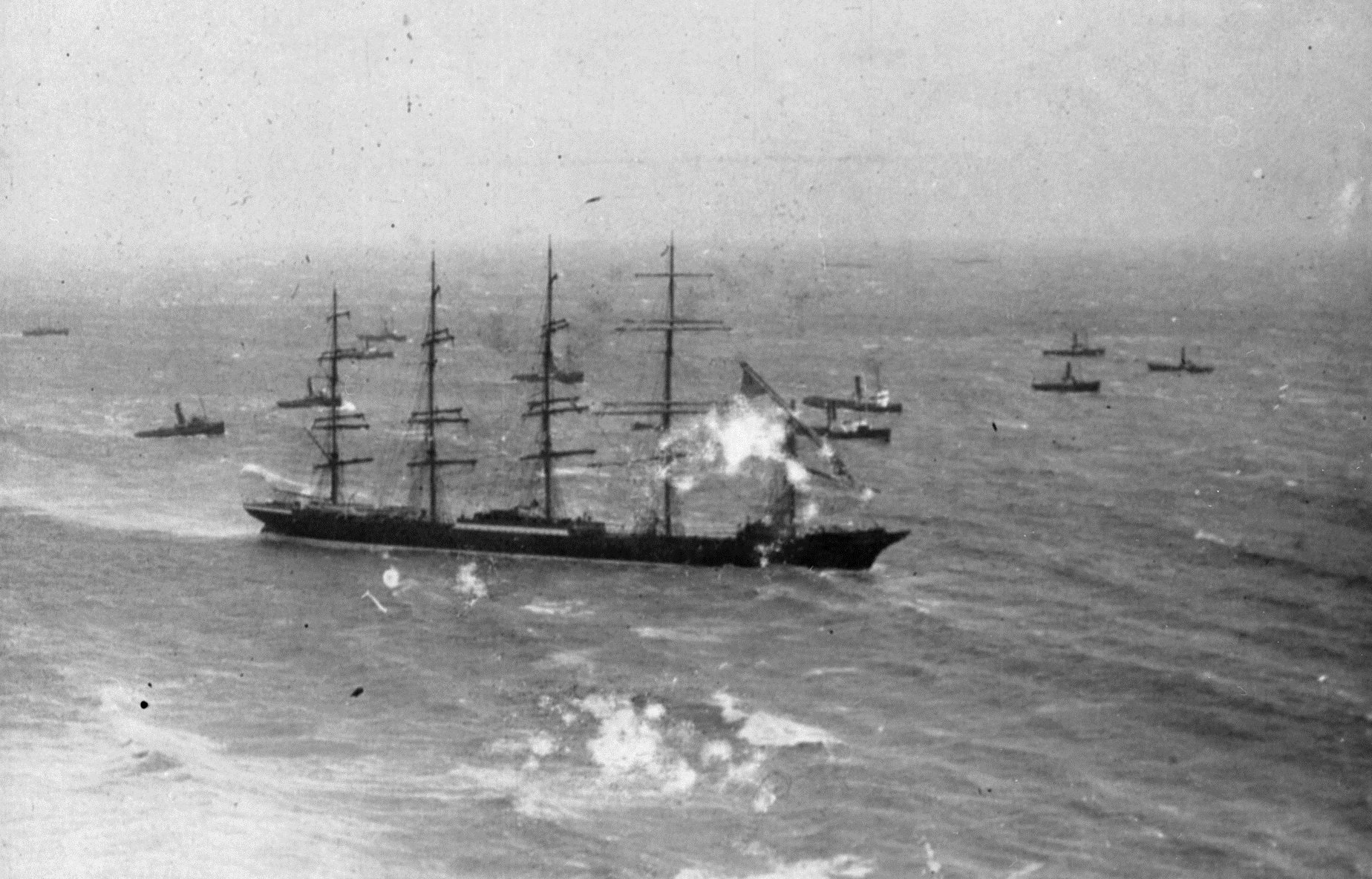
Preussen soon after the 1910 collision

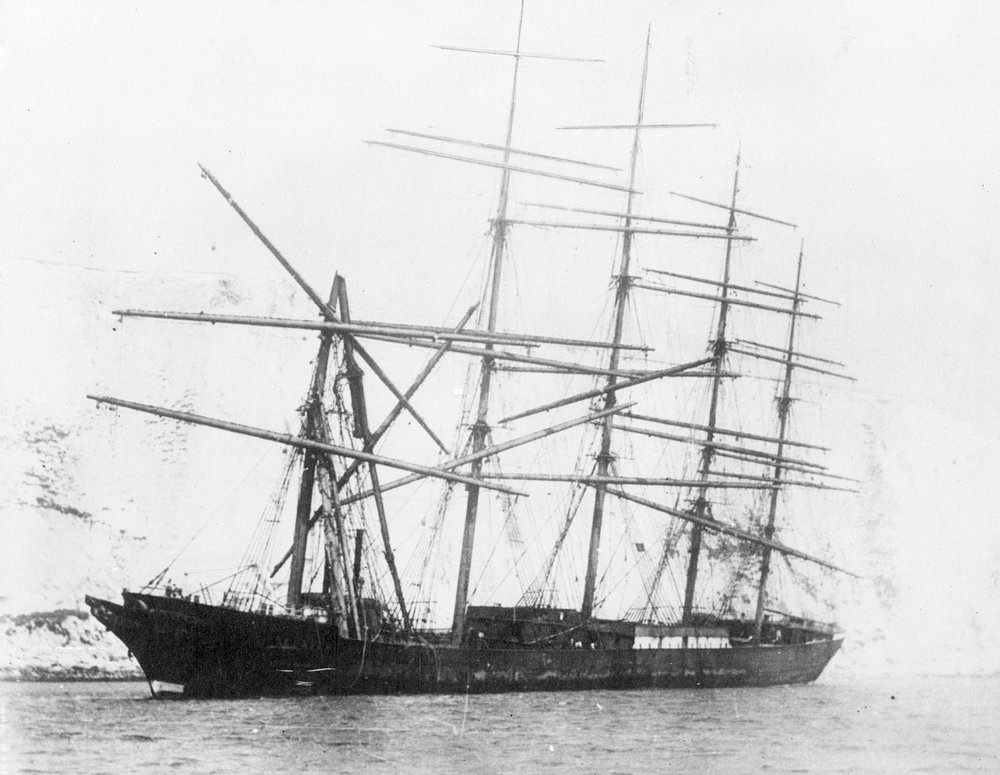
Wreck of Preussen

== Stamps ==
Preussen has appeared on postage stamps issued by the Falkland Islands, Germany, Grenada, Paraguay and Sierra Leone.

== See also ==
- List of large sailing vessels
