= Potosi (barque) =

German trading ship built in 1895

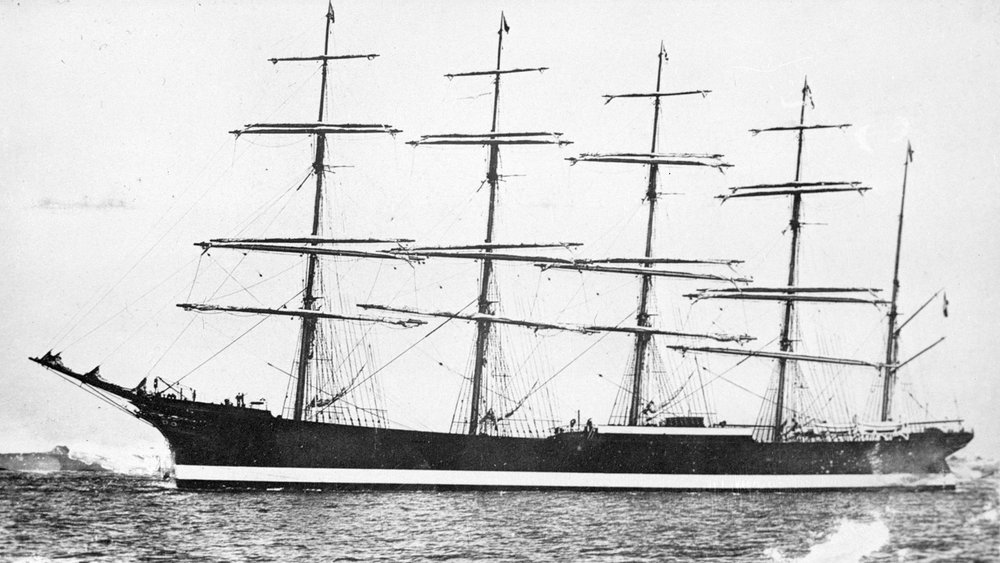
- The Potosi in her maiden voyage on July 26, 1895.

History

German Empire
- Name: Potosi
- Namesake: City of Potosí in Bolivia
- Owner: F. Laeisz Shipping Company
- Route: Hamburg-Chile
- Ordered: 1894
- Builder: Joh. C. Tecklenborg Ship Yard, Geestemünde; Naval architect: Dr. Georg Wilhelm Claussen
- Cost: M 695,000.00
- Yard number: 133
- Laid down: November, 1894
- Launched: June 8, 1895
- Christened: June 8, 1895
- Completed: 1895
- Commissioned: July 26, 1895
- Maiden voyage: July 26, 1895 to Iquique, Chile
- Out of service: 1914–1920 (WWI)
- Renamed: Flora (1923)
- Home port: (German Empire) Hamburg; (German Empire) Bremen; (Argentina) Buenos Aires; (Chile) Valparaíso
- Identification: Code Letters RKGB (Ger.); Code Letters QEPD (Chil.)
- Fate: Sold to Chile in 1923, caught fire on September 15, 1925 and sunk by the Argentine cruiser Patria on October 19
- Badge: None; figurehead (river god or mountain spirit)

General characteristics
- Class & type: Five-masted barque, steel hulled, bulk carrier, nitrate carrier
- Tonnage: 4,027 GRT / 3,854 NRT
- Displacement: 8,350 tons (at 6,400 tons load)
- Length: 436 ft (133 m) (overall); 401.64 ft (122.42 m) (hull); 362.0 ft (110.3 m) (btw. perpendiculars)
- Beam: 49.7 ft (15.1 m)
- Height: 210.96 ft (64.30 m) (keel to masthead truck); 185.7 ft (56.6 m) (waterline to masthead truck)
- Draft: 25.49 ft (7.77 m)
- Depth: 30.15 ft (9.19 m) (depth moulded)
- Depth of hold: 28.38 ft (8.65 m)
- Decks: 2 continuous steel, poop, midship, and forecastle decks
- Deck clearance: 8 ft (2.4 m)
- Installed power: No auxiliary propulsion; donky engine for sail winches, loading gear, pumps
- Propulsion: Sail
- Sail plan: 43 sails: 24 square sails, 12 staysails, 4 foresails, 3 spankers 56,510 sq ft (5,250 m^{2})
- Speed: 19 knots (35 km/h)
- Boats & landing craft carried: 4 lifeboats
- Capacity: 6,400 ts load
- Complement: max. 44
- Crew: Captain, 1st, 2nd, & 3rd mates, steward, 35-39 able seamen and shipboys

Potosi was a five-masted steel barque built in 1895 by Joh. C. Tecklenborg ship yard in Geestemünde, Germany, for the sailing ship company F. Laeisz as a trading vessel. Its primary purpose was as a "nitrate clipper" collecting guano in South America for use in chemical companies in Germany (mainly for making explosives and fertiliser). As its shipping route was between Germany, Bolivia until 1870 but, during the "pacific War" was transferred to Chile, it was designed to be capable of withstanding the rough weather encountered around Cape Horn.

Potosi was named after the Bolivian town of Potosí (the highest city in the world), its name beginning with "P" according to a Laeisz' tradition begun in the 1880s. The Potosi and sister ships became known as the Flying P Line and were described by Robert Carter as "without doubt, the most successful fleet of sail-driven ships ever assembled under one flag..."

Potosi had five masts and was rigged as a barque, meaning that the first four masts were square-rigged, each carrying six sails, and the fifth mast carried three fore-and-aft-sails. She was the third windjammer in the world merchant fleet with that kind of rigging, after the France I of the Antoine-Dominique Bordes line of Bordeaux, and the first German (auxiliary) steel barque Maria Rickmers of the Rickmers line. In total, within the world merchant fleet, there were only six windjammers of this class of five-masted barque rigging, with four masts having carried five, six or partly seven sails on each mast: France I, Maria Rickmers (carried seven sails (skysails) on fore, main, mizzen masts, jigger mast with six sails), Potosi, R.C. Rickmers, France II (carried five sails as a bald header), and København. The Potosi's shipping line sister ship, Preussen also had five masts, but was square rigged on each mast.

The idea of building such a ship for the Laeisz fleet came from the famous Laeisz-captain Robert Hilgendorf, who was to become the Potosi's first master. His considerations and ideas had a great influence on the ship's design and he was the supervising ship officer when the huge barque was under construction. She was assigned the call sign RKGB, and as with all P-liners her hull was black with a white waterline and a red underwater ship—the colours of the German flag at that time. Author Daniel S. Parrott describes the features of the "Flying P-Liners" and says "The effectiveness of the Flying P-Line lay not only in the construction of the vessel but also in their management." He also points out that "none of the four- or five-masted Laeisz ships ever foundered or was dismasted in a Cape Horn storm in the course of countless voyages."

During World War I, she was interned in Chile, and was then given away as reparation. Under Chilean ownership, she was renamed the Flora (sign QEPD). In 1925, she caught fire in the Atlantic and eventually had to be sunk by artillery.

== History ==
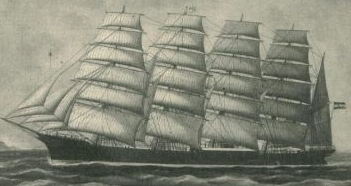
The Potosi under full sail

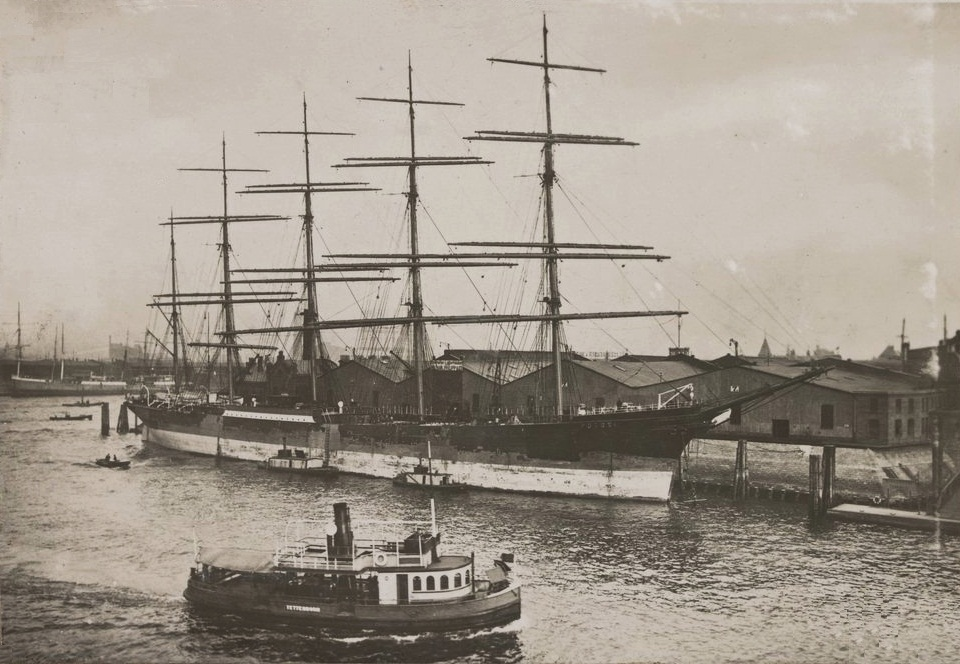
The Potosi at wharf

The Potosi was launched in 1895 at the shipyard of J. C. Tecklenborg AG, Geestemünde and was used in the saltpetre trade (Salpeterfahrt) between Chile and Germany, setting record speeds in the process, due to her excellent sailing characteristics. She made twenty seven "round voyages" (Hamburg to Chile and back) under five captains between 1895 and 1914. Her first master, the legendary sea captain Robert Hilgendorf, sailed her up to 1901. Capt. Georg Schlüter (2 round voyages), Jochim Hans Hinrich Nissen (10), Johann Frömcke (3), and Robert Miethe (4) followed.

On 23 September 1914, due to the onset of the First World War, the Potosi was held at Valparaíso harbour. In 1917 while still moored in Valparaíso, she was sold to the F. A. Vinnen shipping company of Bremen, but on October 2, 1920, she was given to France as part of the vast war reparation demanded from Germany. The French government sold her to Argentina which transferred her to the Floating Docks Co. of Buenos Aires. However the ship remained unmoved in Valparaíso harbour. In 1923 she was eventually purchased by a local company González, Soffia & Cía. of Valparaíso, and renamed the Flora.

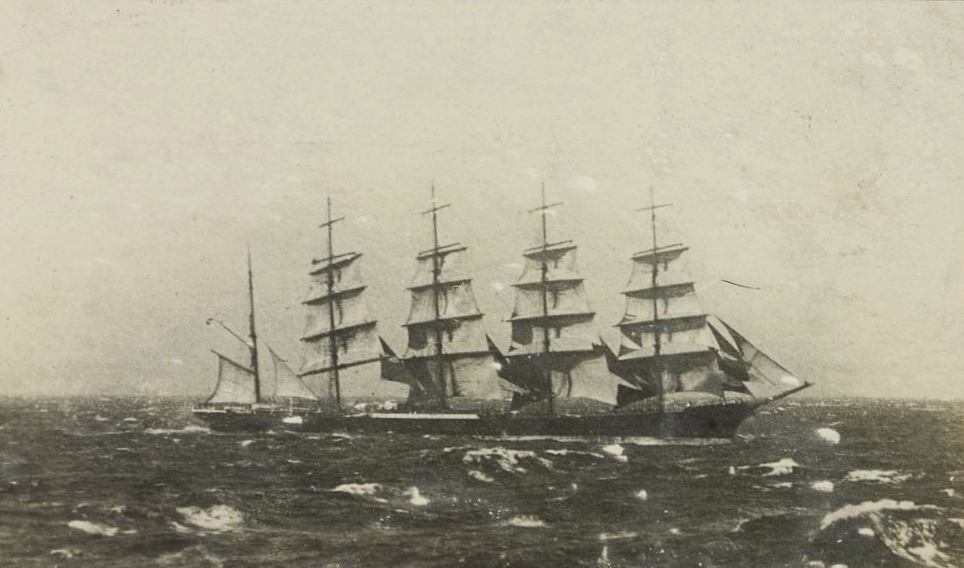
The Potosi on the way to Chile in 1913

After a year of repair and refit, in December 1924, under the name of "Flora", August Oetzmann, a former Laeisz captain, sailed her to Hamburg with a cargo of nitrate in 110 days arriving on 30 March 1925. Many people of Hamburg came to welcome the old lady and wished Laeisz to purchase her from the Chilean owner but this was not possible.

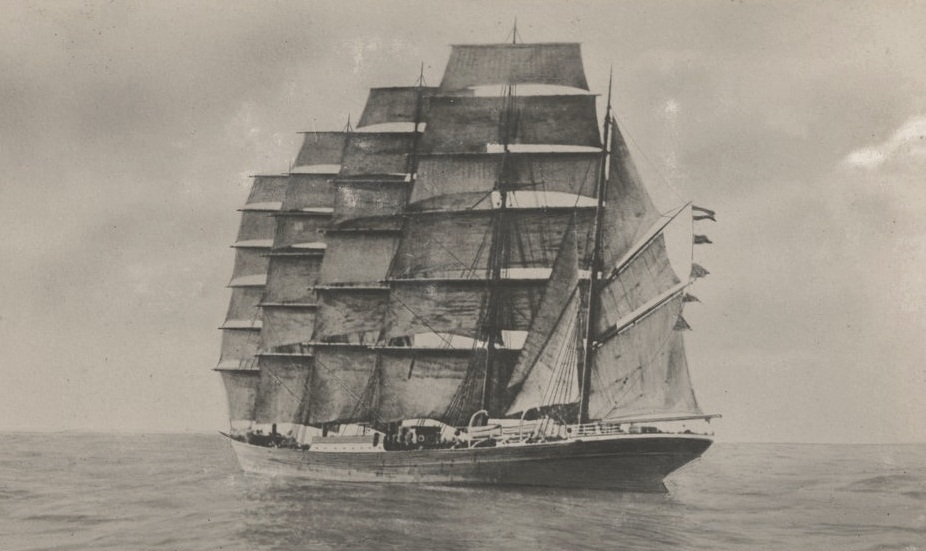
The Potosi

The Flora sailed back to Chile (May 25) via Cardiff (July 17) taking a cargo of 800 tons of coal and 5000 tons of "patent fuel" bound for Mejillones. On September 15, 1925, en route to Cape Horn, the ship caught fire off the Patagonian coast northwest of the Falkland Islands (at 50°17.5'S, 61° 42'W). Captain A. Oetzmann decided to set course to Comodoro Rivadavia, reaching the harbour, which was merely a bay with a sandy beach, a long wooden pier, and several petrol tanks, on September 18, 1925. He anchored the ship five miles (8 km) off the coast in the roads of Comodoro Rivadavia and alerted the harbour authorities to fight the fire in the ship. As no proper equipment was available, it took three days before help came. The ordered fire engine that came was not able to extinguish the fire. Next day a huge explosion ripped her steel decks apart. The main mast fell overboard pulling the rest of the rigging with it except for the foremast. A tug tried to tow her away from the petrol tanks, and succeeded after several attempts. The Flora ran aground on the sandy beach. The seamen dropped the anchor and took everything usable from the ship. The fire kept burning while the ship's hull was repeatedly lifted by the waves and slammed into the shore. The coal-filled hull burned for some days. One morning the ship had disappeared from the beach. The rudderless hull was found a few days later floating 25 nautical miles (46 km) off the coast and 80 nautical miles (150 km) to the north of Comodoro Rivadavia. The Argentine cruiser Patria sank the burning hull of the former famous ship by gunfire on October 19, 1925. The wreck lies near the position 45°15′S 66°15′W.

== Technical data ==
The Potosi was steel-built, with a waterline length of 110 m and a total hull length of 122.42 m. The hull was 15.15 m wide and the ship had a displacement of 8,350 tons, for an effective carrying capacity of 6,400 tons. The ship had only one bulkhead in the bow section—the collision bulkhead.

The ship had five masts, four of which were fully rigged, with courses, upper and lower topsails, upper and lower topgallant sails, and royals. Counting the staysails (12) including jibs (4), she carried 43 sails (24 square sails in six storeys, 12 (normally 9) staysails between the five masts, four foresails (jibs) and three fore-and-aft spanker sails including two spanker sails on two gaffs and a spanker topsail) with a total sail area of 56,510 sq ft (5,250 m^{2}). (Note: Sometimes a much lesser area of 4,700 sq metres is mentioned which is not correct. For comparison, big four-masted barques had sail areas of 4,400 sq metres.)

Not only the hull was steel, but also her masts (2.82 ft (0.86 m) in diameter at deck level, with lower and top mast made in one piece) and most of the spars (yards except for the royal yards, spanker boom) were constructed of steel tubing, with much of the rigging made of steel cable. The only wooden spars were the four royal yards, the four topgallant masts and the two gaffs of the spanker fore-and-aft sails.

She was designed as a so-called "three-island-ship", i.e. a ship that has a midship island (67.2 ft (20.5 m)), also called midship bridge or "Liverpool house" (the first ships equipped with that feature came from Liverpool yards), beside the forecastle (41.1 ft (12.5 m)) and poop (26 ft (7.9 m)) decks. There, inside the Liverpool house, dry and well-ventilated accommodation for crew, mates, and captain were installed, as well as the pantry and chart room. The main helm— a double rudder wheel of 5.8 ft (1.8 m) diameter— stood on top, well protected against huge waves. A second helm was near the stern.

Under good conditions, the huge barque could reach a speed of 19 knots (35 km/h). Her best 24-hour-run was 376 nm in 1900 under Capt. Hilgendorf. The Potosi was manned by a crew of 40–44. She was the fastest P-liner apart from the five-masted fully rigged ship Preußen which could reach speeds of more than 20 knots (37 km/h), but was less maneuverable.

== Mast names ==
From bow to stern her five masts were named as follows:

- Fore mast, main mast, middle mast, mizzen mast (also: after mast or "Laeisz" mast), spanker mast

In German:

- Fockmast, Großmast, Mittelmast, Kreuzmast und Besanmast

Standard nomenclature for five-masted schooners and barquentines

- Fore mast, main mast, mizzen mast, jigger mast, spanker mast

== See also ==
- List of large sailing vessels
