= Peking (ship) =

Steel-hulled four-masted barque

Coordinates: 53°50′24″N 9°24′5″E

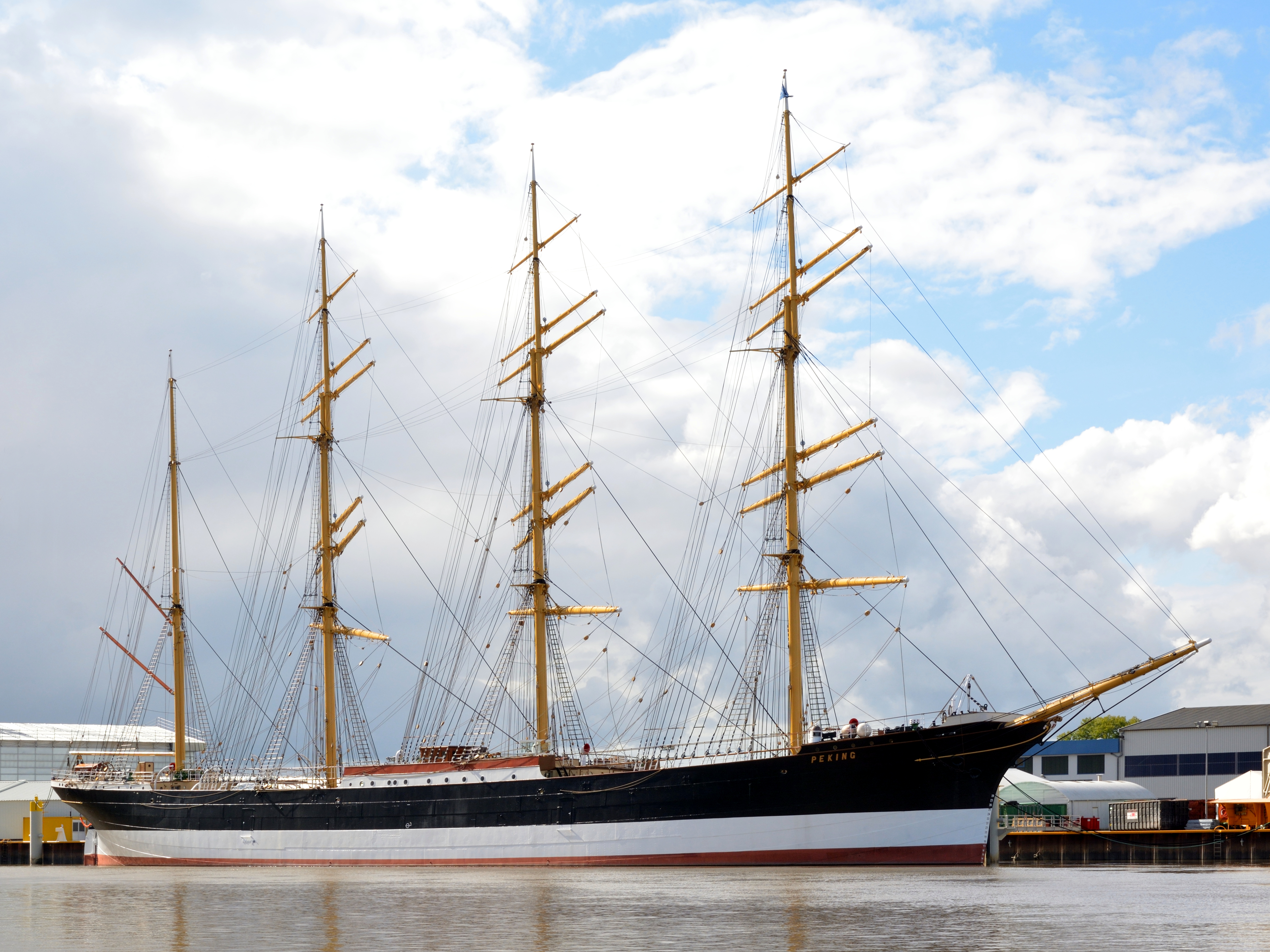
- Peking

History

German Empire
- Name: Peking
- Namesake: City of Beijing
- Owner: F. Laeisz
- Route: Europe–Chile
- Builder: Blohm & Voss, Steinwerder, Hamburg
- Yard number: 205
- Launched: 25 February 1911
- Completed: May 1911
- Out of service: 1920
- Notes: Interned at Valparaíso 1914–1920, then to Italy as war reparations

Kingdom of Italy
- In service: 1920
- Out of service: 1923

Weimar Republic
- Name: Peking
- Operator: F. Laeisz
- Route: Europe–Chile
- Acquired: 1923
- Out of service: 1932

United Kingdom
- Name: Arethusa
- Owner: Shaftesbury Homes
- In service: 1932–1940, 1945–1975
- Out of service: 1975
- Home port: Upnor, Medway

United Kingdom
- Name: HMS Pekin
- Operator: Royal Navy
- Commissioned: 1940
- Decommissioned: 1945

United States
- Name: Peking
- Owner: South Street Seaport Museum
- Acquired: 1975
- Out of service: 2017
- Home port: New York City
- Status: Museum ship

Germany
- Name: Peking
- Owner: German Port Museum
- Acquired: 2017
- In service: 2020
- Home port: Hamburg
- Status: Museum ship

General characteristics
- Class & type: Flying P-Liner
- Displacement: 3,100 long tons (3,150 t)
- Length: 377 ft 6 in (115.06 m) sparred length; 320 ft (98 m) length on deck
- Beam: 45 ft 7 in (13.89 m)
- Height: 170 ft 6 in (51.97 m)
- Draft: 16 ft (4.9 m)
- Sail plan: 44,132 sq ft (4,100.0 m^{2}) sail area

Peking is a steel-hulled four-masted barque. A so-called Flying P-Liner of the German company F. Laeisz, it was one of the last generation of cargo-carrying iron-hulled sailing ships used in the nitrate trade and wheat trade around Cape Horn.

This ship was a museum ship in New York City from 1974, but was moved back to Germany in 2017. She has been a museum ship in Hamburg since September 2020.

== History ==
=== Nitrate trade ===
Peking was launched in February 1911 and left Hamburg for her maiden voyage to Valparaíso in May of the same year. After the outbreak of World War I she was interned at Valparaíso and remained in Chile for the duration of the war. Awarded to the Kingdom of Italy as war reparations, she was sold back to her original owners, the Laeisz brothers, in January 1923. She remained in the nitrate trade until traffic through the Panama Canal proved quicker and more economical.

=== Arethusa II ===
In 1932, she was sold for £6,250 to Shaftesbury Homes. She was first towed to Greenhithe, renamed Arethusa II and moored alongside the existing Arethusa I. In July 1933, she was moved to a new permanent mooring off Upnor on the River Medway, where she served as a children's home and training school. She was officially "opened" by Prince George on 25 July 1933. During World War II she served in the Royal Navy as HMS Pekin.

=== Museum ship in New York ===
Arethusa II was retired in 1974 and sold to Jack Aron as Peking, for the South Street Seaport Museum in New York City, where she remained for the next four decades. However, the Seaport NYC did not see Peking as part of its long-term operational plans, and was planning to send the vessel to the scrapyard. A 2012 offer to return the ship to Hamburg, where she was originally built, as a gift from the city of New York, was contingent upon raising an endowment in Germany to ensure the preservation of the vessel.

=== Return to Germany ===
In November 2015 the Maritim Foundation purchased the ship for US$100. Peking is intended to become part of the German Port Museum (Deutsches Hafenmuseum) at Schuppen 52 in Hamburg for which €120 million of federal funds would be provided. She was taken to Caddell Drydock, Staten Island, on 7 September 2016, to spend the winter. On 14 July 2017 she was loaded on the deck of the semi-submersible heavy-lift ship Combi Dock III for transport across the Atlantic, at a cost of some €1 million, arriving at Brunsbüttel on 30 July 2017.

=== Refurbishment in Germany ===
On 2 August 2017 she was transferred to Peters Werft, located at Wewelsfleth, for a three-year refurbishment at a cost of €38 million. The restoration included review of rigging, double floor steel plates, dismounting and remount of all masts, docking in dry dock, renewal of the steel structure, removal of the cement that filled the lower three and a half metres (11 ft) of the hull, painting, woodwork and overall refurbishment. The ship twice spent about two years in dry dock. Peking was refloated on 7 September 2018 with a primer-painted hull. Teak was reinstalled on deck. The ship was transferred on 7 September 2020 to the German Port Museum.

== In popular culture ==
- A specific voyage of the vessel from Hamburg to Valparaíso in the late 1920s was immortalized in the film “Around Cape Horn” by American author and sail-training Captain Irving Johnson when he sailed on board as an apprentice, the footage of which was featured in the British Museum according to his narration of the film in the 1980 version produced by Mystic Seaport Museum. Johnson also wrote a book about the voyage by the same name.
- "Around the Wild Cape Horn" from Ralph McTell's album Somewhere Down the Road is about Peking.
- Tom Lewis's song "Peking" on the album Mixed Cargo is about Peking.
- The ship was the setting for the 1965 Margaret Rutherford film Murder Ahoy as "HMS Battledore".
- The ship is mentioned in Elton John's biography as the place of the after-gig party where Elton met John Lennon.

== See also ==
- List of large sailing vessels
- Padua – still active as a sail training ship under Russian flag as Kruzenshtern. Unique among them in having been motorised.
- Pamir – lost 1957 in the Atlantic
- Passat – museum ship in Germany, and sister ship to Peking
- Pommern – museum ship in Finland
- Other preserved barques:
  - Glenlee – museum ship in Glasgow
  - Balclutha
  - Star of India
  - Moshulu
  - James Craig
  - Elissa
  - Sigyn – the last wooden barque in original configuration

== Bibliography ==
- Johnson, Irving. Round the Horn in a Square Rigger (Milton Bradley, 1932) (reprinted as The Peking Battles Cape Horn (Sea History Press, 1977 ISBN 0-930248-02-3)
- Johnson, Irving. Around Cape Horn (film) (Mystic Seaport, 1985) (from original 16 mm footage shot by Irving Johnson, 1929)
