= Passat (ship) =

German sailship

Coordinates: 53°57′29″N 10°52′53″E

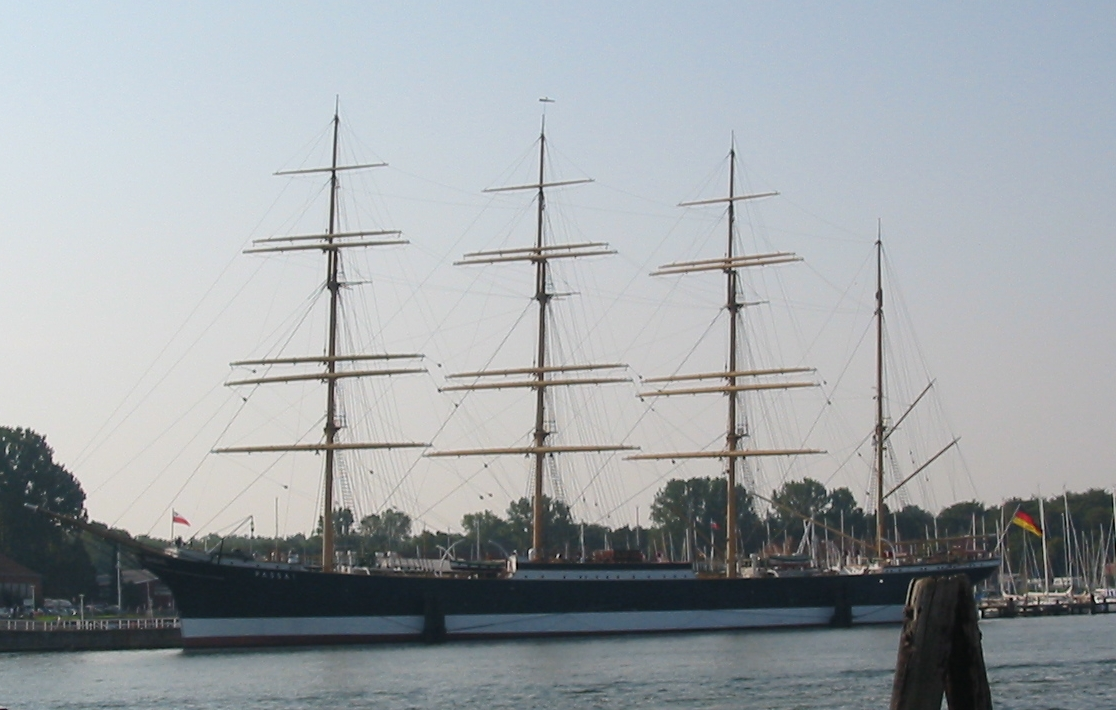
- Passat in Travemünde

History

Germany
- Name: Passat
- Namesake: Tradewind
- Owner: F. Laeisz Shipping Company
- Port of registry: (German Empire) Hamburg (1911-19); (Weimar Republic) Hamburg (1919-21); (France) Marseille (1921); (Weimar Republic) Hamburg (1922-32); (Finland) Mariehamn (1932-51); (West Germany) Hamburg (1951-58), Lübeck (since 1958)
- Route: Hamburg-Chile; 1 journey round the world
- Ordered: 1908
- Builder: Blohm & Voss, Hamburg
- Cost: German gold mark 680,000.00
- Yard number: 206
- Laid down: 2 March 1911
- Launched: 20 September 1911
- Decommissioned: 1957
- Maiden voyage: 24 December 1911 to Valparaíso (arr. 14 March 1912)
- Identification: MMSI number: 211369440; Callsign: DH6101
- Status: Youth hostel

General characteristics
- Class & type: four-masted steel barque; nitrate carrier
- Displacement: 6.180 ts
- Tons burthen: 4.700 ts
- Length: 377 ft (115 m) (length overall); 319 ft (97 m) (length on deck)
- Beam: 47.3 ft (14.4 m)
- Height: 178 ft (54 m) (waterline to masthead truck)
- Draft: 24 ft (7.3 m)
- Depth: 28 ft (8.5 m) (depth moulded)
- Depth of hold: 26.5 ft (8.1 m)
- Decks: 5: 2 continuous steel decks, poop, forecastle, and midship decks
- Installed power: originally no auxiliary propulsion; Since 1951: built-in sub diesel (~900 HP)
- Propulsion: sail
- Sail plan: 34 sails: 18 square sails, 9 staysails, 4 foresails, 3 spanker sails; sail area: 49,514 sq ft (4,600 m²); later on: 43,056 sq ft (4,000 m²)
- Speed: 18 knots (33.34 km/h) under sail (6.4 kn with engine)
- Boats & landing craft carried: 4 lifeboats
- Complement: 26-35
- Crew: captain, 1st, 2nd, & 3rd mates, steward, 21 to 30 able seamen and shipboys

Passat (Note: Passat is German for 'trade wind.') is a German four-masted steel barque and one of the Flying P-Liners, the famous sailing ships of the German shipping company F. Laeisz. She is one of the last surviving windjammers.

== History ==
Passat was launched in 1911 at the Blohm & Voss shipyard in Hamburg. She began her maiden voyage on Christmas Eve 1911 toward Cape Horn and the nitrate ports of Chile. She was used for decades to ship general cargo outbound and nitrate home. Passat was interned at Iquique for the duration of World War I and in 1921 sailed to Marseille and was turned over to France as war reparation. The French government put her up for sale, and the Laeisz Company was able to buy the ship back for £13,000. Again she was used as a nitrate carrier until 1932 when Passat was sold to the Gustaf Erikson Line of Finland. The ship was then used in the grain trade from Spencer Gulf in South Australia to Europe. At the onset of World War II, Passat was at her home port Mariehamn in the Åland Islands of Finland. She was towed to Stockholm in 1944 to serve as a storage ship.

In 1948 the Erikson Line reentered the grain trade, and together with Pamir she participated in the last Great Grain Race in 1949 from Port Victoria around Cape Horn to Europe. Among her crew was Niels Jannasch who later became the director of Canada's Maritime Museum of the Atlantic. All told, Passat rounded Cape Horn 39 times.

Edgar Erikson (son of Gustaf Erikson, who died in 1947) found he could no longer operate Passat and Pamir at a profit, primarily due to changing regulations and union contracts governing employment aboard ships; the traditional two-watch system on sailing ships was replaced by the three-watch system in use on motor-ships, requiring more crew. In March 1951, Belgian shipbreakers paid £40,000, equivalent to £1.09 million in 2025, for both Passat and Pamir.

German shipowner Heinz Schliewen stepped in and bought both ships for conversion to freight carrying school ships (thus often erroneously referred to as sister ships). The two vessels were modernized at Kiel with refurbished quarters to accommodate merchant marine trainees, fitted with an auxiliary diesel engine, a refrigeration system for the galleys (precluding the need to carry live animals for fresh meat), modern communications equipment and water ballast tanks. After financial problems for the owner, a newly organized consortium of forty German shipowners purchased the ships. For the next five years Passat (and Pamir) continued to sail between Europe and the east coast of South America, primarily to Argentina, but not around Cape Horn.

In 1957, a few weeks after the tragic loss of Pamir mid-Atlantic, and shortly after having been severely hit by a storm, Passat was decommissioned. She had almost experienced the same fate as the Pamir when her loose barley cargo shifted.

Passat was purchased in 1959 by the Baltic Sea municipality of Lübeck and is now a youth hostel, venue, museum ship, and landmark moored at Travemünde, a borough of Lübeck in the German federal state of Schleswig-Holstein.

== Sister ships ==
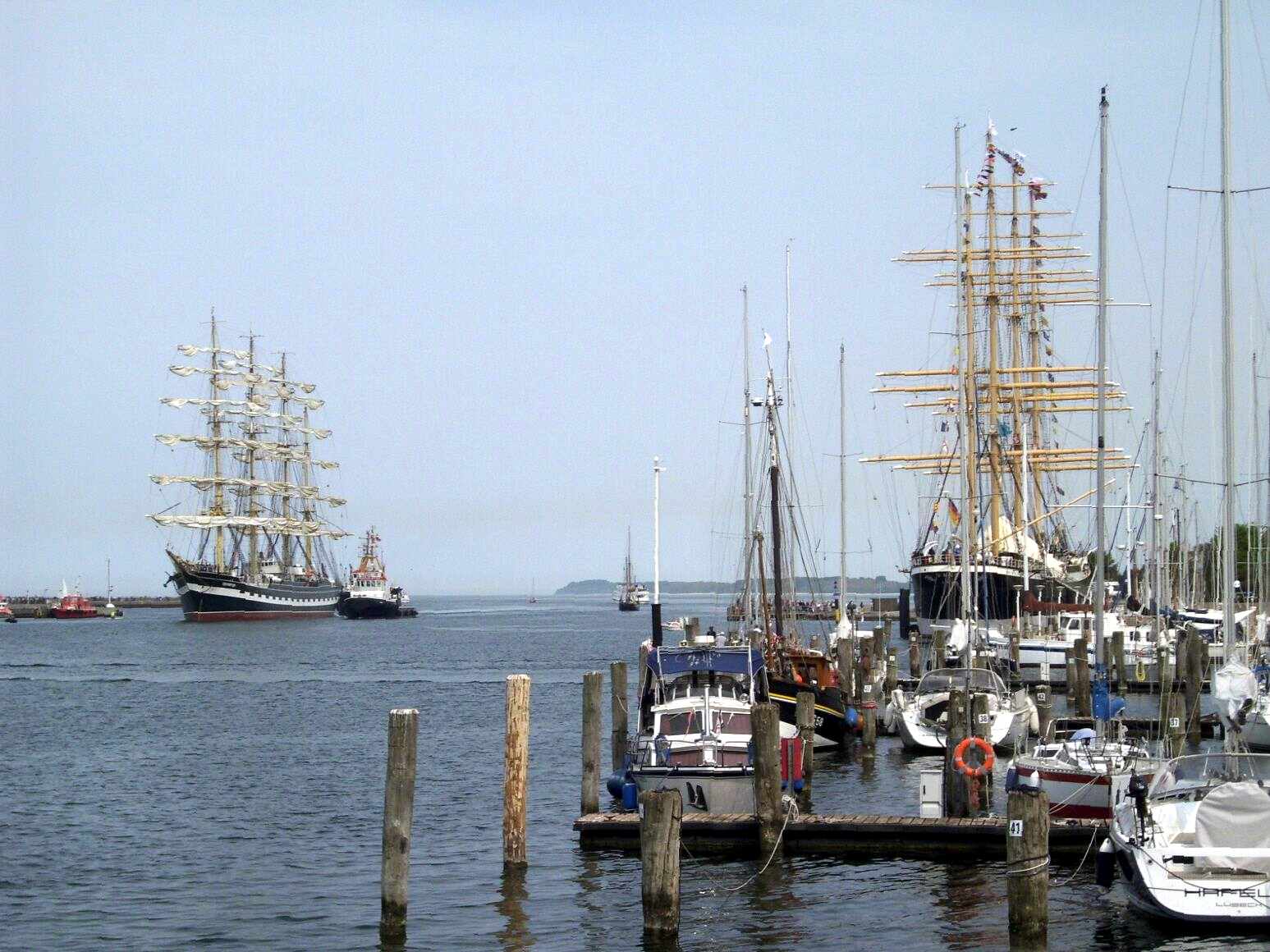
Kruzenshtern meeting Passat on the occasion of her one hundredth anniversary in 2011

Passat's true sister ship is Peking. Pamir has often been, and is still discussed as Passat's sister ship because both ships were owned and operated by the same consortium of German shipowners in the 1950s. The last eight four-masted barques ordered by Laeisz have been incorrectly called "The Eight Sisters" because of their similarity, including Pangani, Petschili, Pamir, Passat, Peking, Priwall, Pola (which never sailed under the Laeisz flag) and Padua, now under the Russian flag as the training ship Kruzenshtern. Of these eight ships, Pangani, Petschili, Pamir and Padua had no true sister ships.

== Sources ==
- Apollonio, Spencer, ed. (2000). The Last of the Cape Horners. Firsthand Accounts from the Final Days of the Commercial Tall Ships. Washington, D.C.: Brassey’s. ISBN 1-57488-283-X.
- Stark, William F. (2003). The Last Time Around Cape Horn. The Historic 1949 Voyage of the Windjammer Pamir. New York: Carroll & Graf Publishers. ISBN 0-7867-1233-3.
- Stiftung Pamir und Passat [Foundation Pamir and Passat] (in German). n.d.
- Thesleff, Holger [in German] (1951). Farewell Windjammer. an Account of the Last Circumnavigation of the Globe by a Sailing Ship and the Last Grain Race from Australia to England. London: Thames & Hudson.
