= Flying P-Liner =

Sailing ships of the German shipping company F. Laeisz

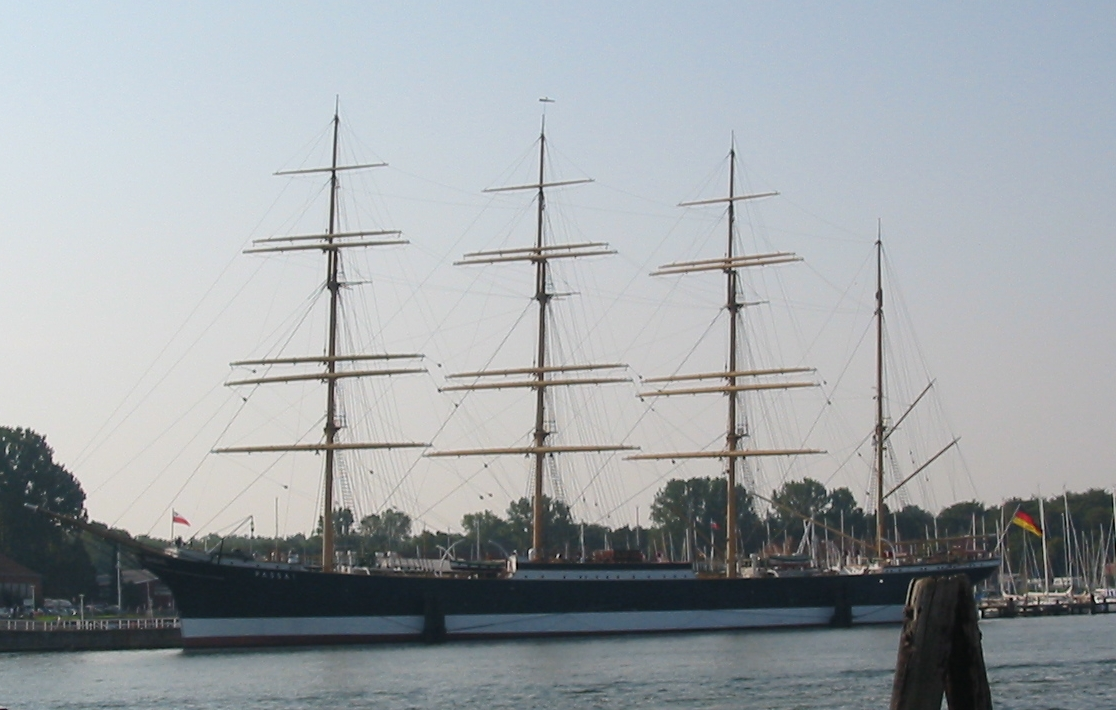
Passat in Travemünde, Germany

The Flying P-Liners were the sailing ships of the German shipping company F. Laeisz of Hamburg.

== History ==
The company was founded in 1824 by Ferdinand Laeisz as a hat manufacturing company. He was quite successful and distributed his hats even in South America. In 1839, he had the three-masted wooden brig Carl (named after his son) built and entered the shipping business, but lack of success made him sell the ship a short five years later.

Ferdinand's son Carl Laeisz entered the business in 1852. It was he who turned the F. Laeisz company into a shipping business. In 1857, they ordered a barque which they named Pudel (which was the nickname of Carl's wife Sophie), and from the mid-1880s on, all their ships had names starting with "P" and they became known as "the P-line". The last ship without a "P-name" was the wooden barque Henriette Behn which was stranded on the Mexican coast in 1885.

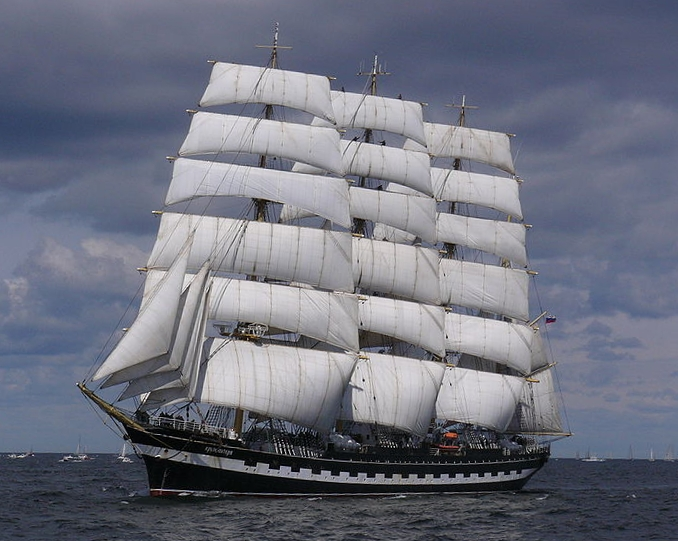
Kruzenshtern (ex-Padua) under sail

The Laeisz company specialized in the South American nitrate trade. Their ships were built for speed, and they soon acquired an excellent reputation for timeliness and reliability, which gave rise to the nickname "the Flying P-Line". The five-masted barque Potosi made the voyage from Chile to England around Cape Horn in 1904 in just 57 days, a record at the time.

The Laeisz company had some of the largest sailing ships ever built. They experimented with steel-hulled five-masters, first the barque Potosi (1895) and in 1902 the huge full-rigged ship Preussen with a length of 147 metres (482 ft 3 in), 5,081 gross register tons (GRT), and over 7,800 tons deadweight (DWT). She could sail faster than 18 knots (33 km/h; 21 mph) and her best 24-hour distance was 392 sm in 1908 on her voyage to Yokohama. However, these ships turned out to be too big: their crews did not like them, and it became increasingly difficult to achieve a satisfactory utilization on the outbound leg from Europe to Chile. The later ships, such as Peking or Passat, returned to being smaller four-masted barques.

During World War I, many of Laeisz' ships were blocked in Chilean ports and had to be handed over as war reparations. However, the Laeisz company was able to re-acquire many ships after the war and put them into service again.

Towards the end of the 1920s, the company began pulling out of the nitrate trade and increasingly started transporting other goods, e.g. bananas. They also sold some of their older ships, for instance Pamir to Gustav Erikson in Finland who already had acquired the former Norddeutscher-Lloyd ship Herzogin Cecilie. The last sailing ship ordered by the Laeisz company was Padua in 1926. Subsequently, the Laeisz company only ordered steamships.

== Ships ==
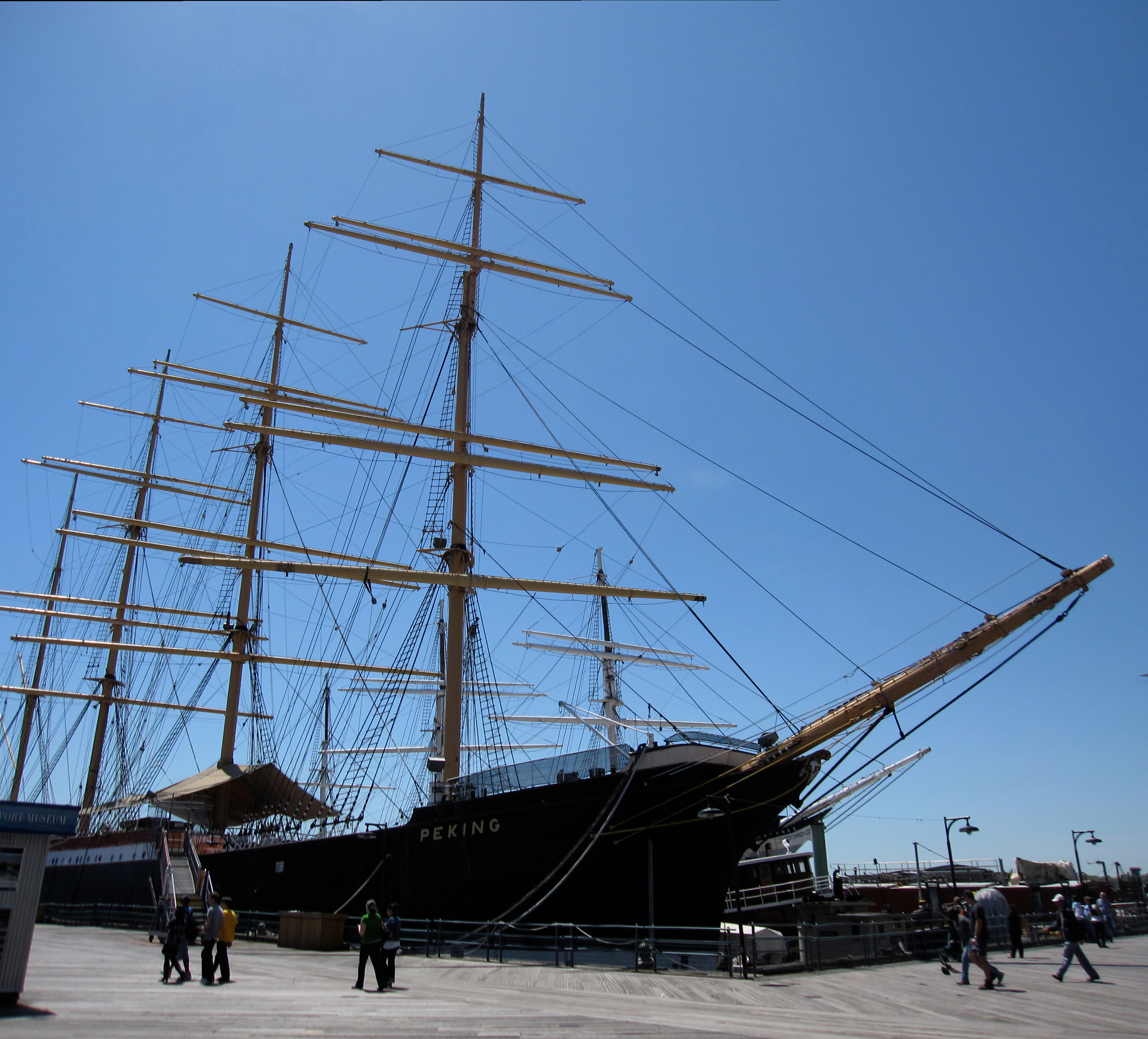
Peking, at South Street Seaport, New York

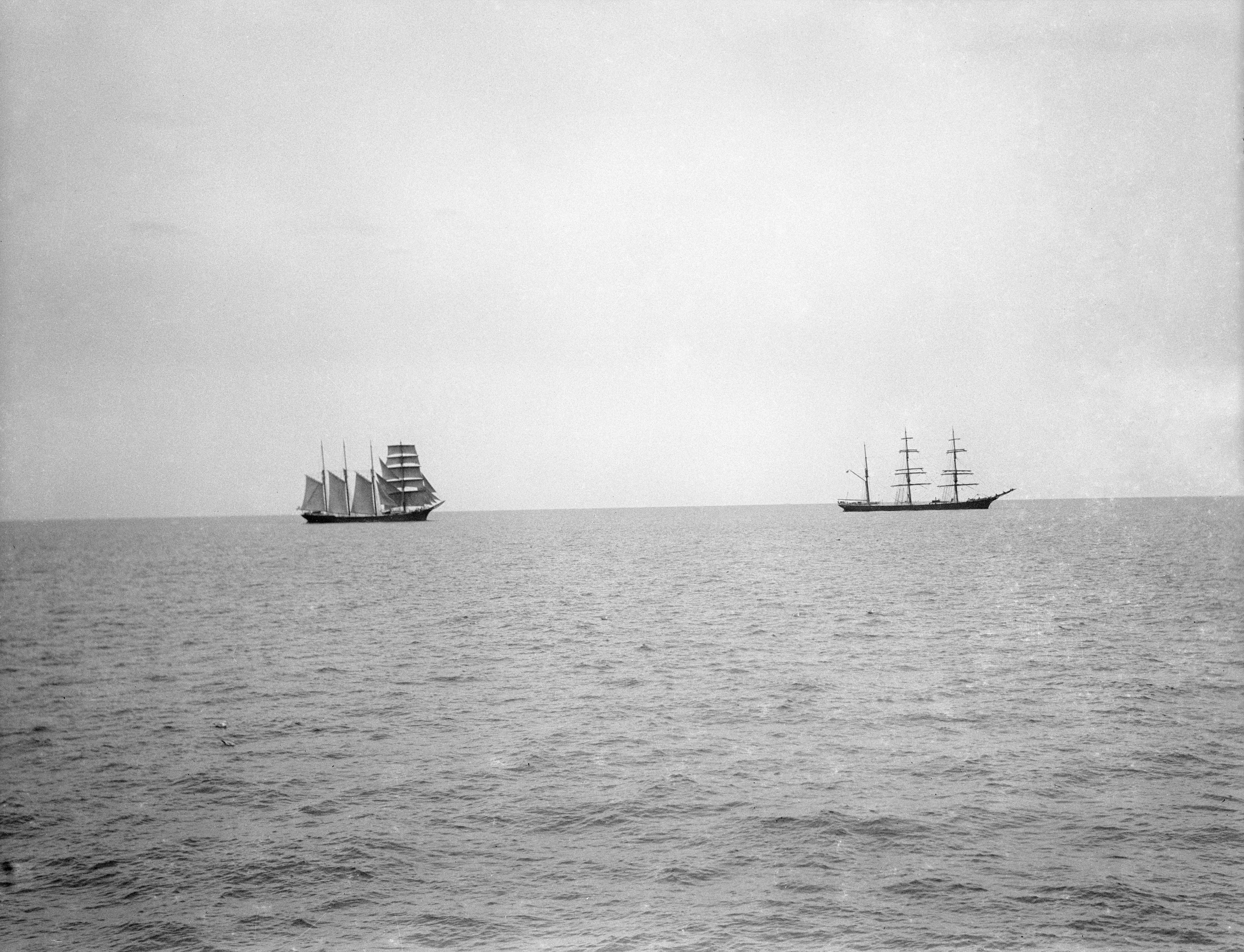
Mozart (left) and Penang (right), formerly Albert Rickmers, photo by Alan Villiers

Four of the Flying P-Liners still exist today:

- Pommern is a museum ship in Mariehamn, Finland.
- Peking is a museum ship in Hamburg, Germany.
- Passat is a museum ship in Lübeck's sea resort Travemünde, Germany.
- Padua is the only ship still active: she is today a school ship and sails as Kruzenshtern under a Russian flag.

Other famous Flying P-Liners were a five-masted barque and a five-masted full-rigged ship (both built by Joh. C. Tecklenborg ship yard in Geestemünde)

- Potosi, (barque) built 1895, sold 1923, caught fire and sunk off Argentina in 1925
- Preussen II, (full-rigged ship) built 1902, beached in 1910 after being rammed by a steamer

and the four-masted barques

- Pamir, built 1905, capsized and sunk in 1957, 80 died, 6 rescued.
- Pisagua, built 1892, stranded 1912 South Shetlands
- Placilla, built 1892, stranded in Norfolk 1905
- Ponape, built 1903 in Italy, scrapped 1936
- Priwall, built 1917, given to the Chilean navy, in 1943 as it was in Valparaiso when the Chilean government declared war on Germany, later became the Chilean Navy schoolship Lautaro, which caught fire in the way to Mexico and sunk off the coast of Peru in 1945.
- Parma, built 1902, after an accident in 1936 was scrapped in 1938

Other P-Line ships were:

- Pudel, built 1857, sunk 1870
- Palmyra, steel full-rigged ship built in 1889 by Blohm & Voss, Hamburg. Stranded on the Wellington Islands on the South Chilean coast 2 July 1908. The captain and the first mate were able to reach shore but the rest of the crew of 21 men disappeared in one of the lifeboats.
- Pera, built 1890, torpedoed 1917
- Pitlochry, built 1894, sunk 1913 in the English Channel
- Preussen I, built 1902, sunk in South Atlantic 1909
- Pellworm, built 1902, sunk 1944
- Pangani, built 1903, sunk 1913
- Penang, built 1905, torpedoed 1940

The Laeisz shipping company still exists today, operating many freighters under traditional names.

== See also ==
- List of large sailing vessels
