= Spanker (sail) =

Type of sail

The spanker is the fore-and-aft sail at the lower right.

On a square rigged ship, the spanker is a gaff-rigged fore-and-aft sail set from, and aft of, the aftmost mast. Spankers are also called driver, jigger, and pusher sail.

On a schooner of four or more masts, the spanker is the sail on the mast nearest the stern.

The spanker is a small sail, but as it is so far aft of the balance point of the hull, it has strong leverage. When sheeted in, the spanker is important in driving the boat to a new tack.
