= Kruzenshtern (ship) =

Four-masted barque built in 1926

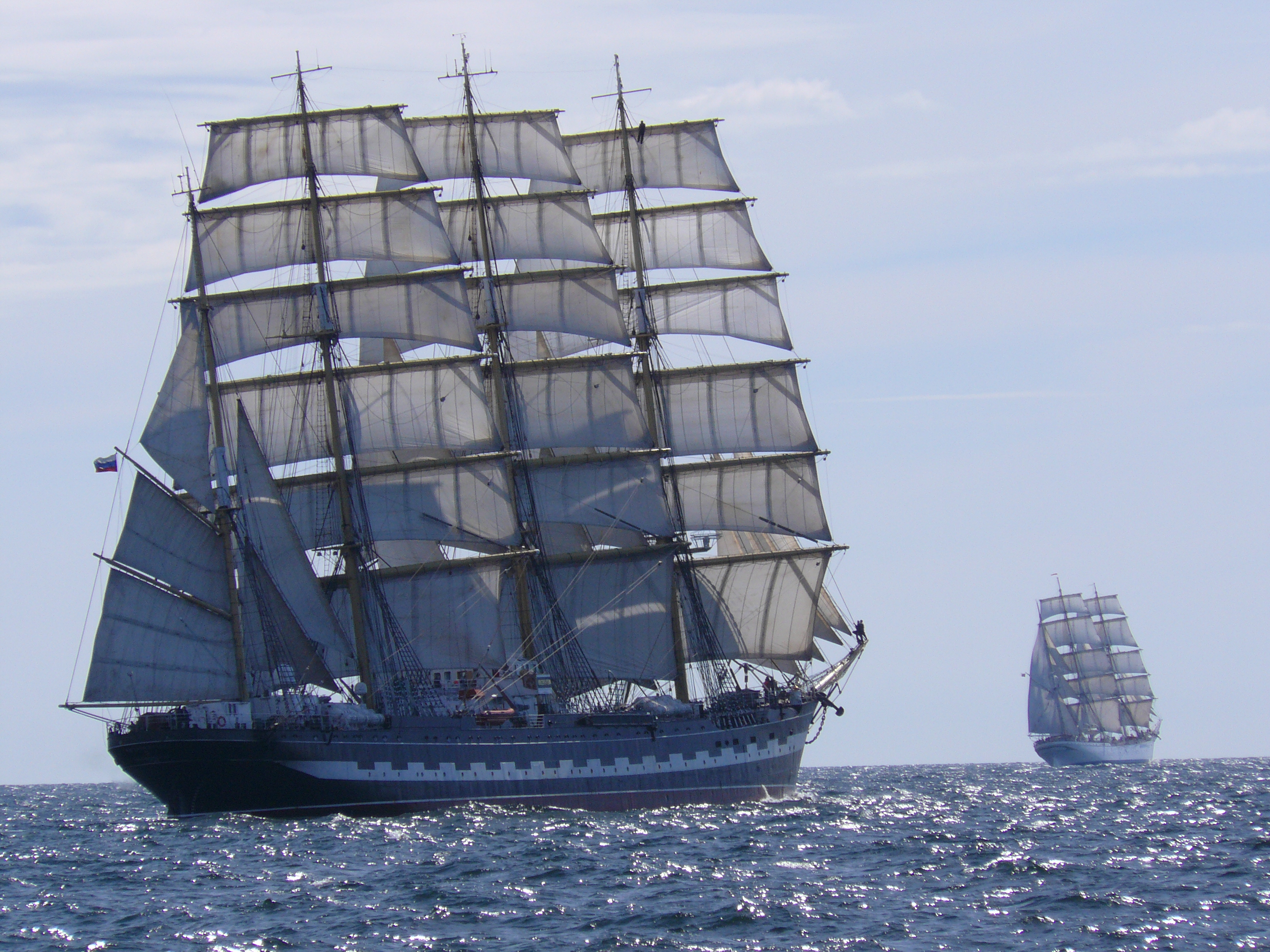
- Kruzenshtern sails astern of Statsraad Lehmkuhl

History

Germany
- Name: Padua
- Namesake: Padua
- Owner: F. Laeisz, Hamburg (1926–46)
- Operator: F. Laeisz, Hamburg (1926–46)
- Port of registry: (Weimar Republic) Hamburg (1920–1933); Hamburg (1933–1945); Hamburg (1945–1946)
- Route: as Padua: between Hamburg & Chile
- Builder: Joh. C. Tecklenborg, Bremerhaven
- Yard number: 408
- Launched: 11 June 1926
- Fate: Surrendered to the USSR as reparations 1946

Soviet Union
- Name: Krusenstern
- Namesake: Admiral Ivan Fyodorovich Kruzenshtern (Russian: Ива́н Фёдорович Крузенште́рн), born Adam Johann Ritter von Krusenstern
- Owner: Soviet Navy (1946–91)
- Port of registry: (Soviet Union) Riga (1946–1981); (Soviet Union) Tallinn (1981–1991)

Russia
- Name: Krusenstern
- Namesake: Admiral Ivan Fyodorovich Kruzenshtern (Russian: Ива́н Фёдорович Крузенште́рн), born Adam Johann Ritter von Krusenstern
- Owner: Baltic State Academy Kaliningrad (from 1991)
- Port of registry: (Russia) Kaliningrad (from 1991)
- Acquired: 1991
- Identification: IMO number: 6822979; Call sign: UCVK; MMSI number: 273243700
- Status: in service

General characteristics
- Type: cargo ship (1926–46); survey ship & training ship (1961–65); training ship 1965–present
- Tonnage: 3,064 GRT (as Padua)
- Length: 114.4 m (375 ft)
- Beam: 14.02 m (46.0 ft)
- Height: 51.3 m (168 ft)
- Draught: 6.8 m (22 ft)
- Installed power: 2 × 1,000 bhp 8-cylinder diesel engines
- Propulsion: sail & screw
- Speed: 17.3 knots (32.0 km/h; 19.9 mph)
- Crew: 257
- Notes: Holds record for sailing between Hamburg and Australia via Chile: 8 months and 23 days

Kruzenshtern or Krusenstern (Russian: Крузенштерн) is a four-masted barque (Russian: барк) that was built in 1926 at Geestemünde in Bremerhaven, Germany as Padua (named after the Italian city). She was surrendered to the USSR in 1946 as war reparation and renamed after the early 19th-century Baltic German explorer in Russian service, Adam Johann von Krusenstern (1770–1846). She is now a Russian sail training ship.

Of the four remaining Flying P-Liners, the former Padua is the only one still in use, mainly for training purposes, with her home ports in Kaliningrad (formerly Königsberg).

== As Padua ==
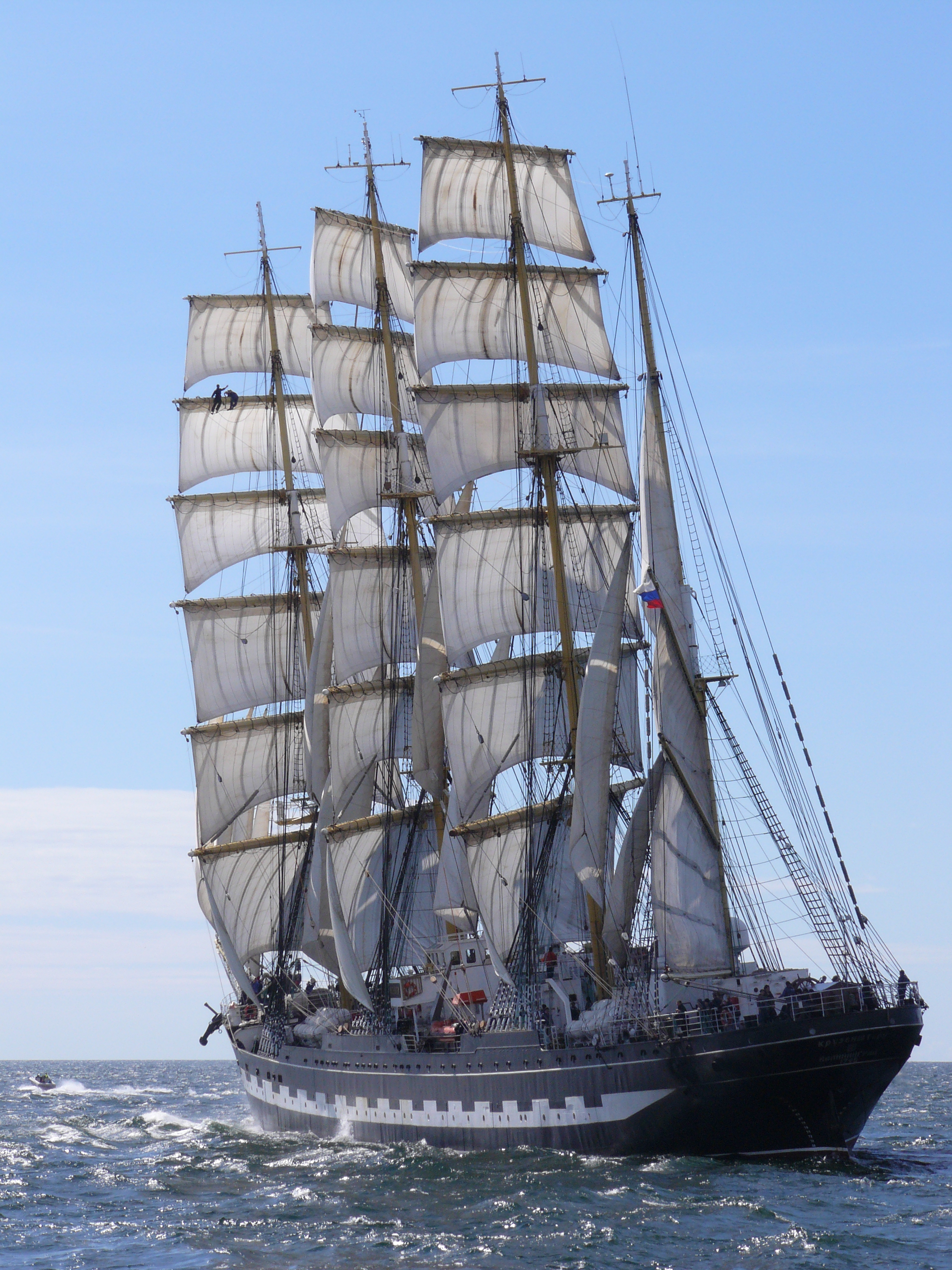
Under sail

Launched in 1926 as the last of the P-Liners, Padua was commissioned as a cargo ship, used among other things to ship construction material to Chile, South America, returning with saltpeter around Cape Horn. Later she transported wheat from Australia. Her maiden voyage from Hamburg to Talcahuano, Chile took 87 days. Like all P-liners, Padua was painted according to the colours of the German national flag of the German Empire era: black (hull above water, topsides), white (waterline area) and red (underwater body).

Portions of the 1944 film Große Freiheit Nr. 7 were filmed on board the Padua.

== As Kruzenshtern ==
On 12 January 1946 she was surrendered to the USSR and integrated into the Baltic Fleet of the Soviet Navy. She was moored in Kronstadt harbour until 1961. From 1961 to 1965 she undertook many hydrographic and oceanographical surveys for the Academy of Sciences of the USSR in the Atlantic Ocean, the Caribbean, and Mediterranean, and was used as a training vessel for naval cadets. In 1965 she was transferred to the USSR Ministry of Fisheries in Riga to be used as a schoolship for future fishery officers.

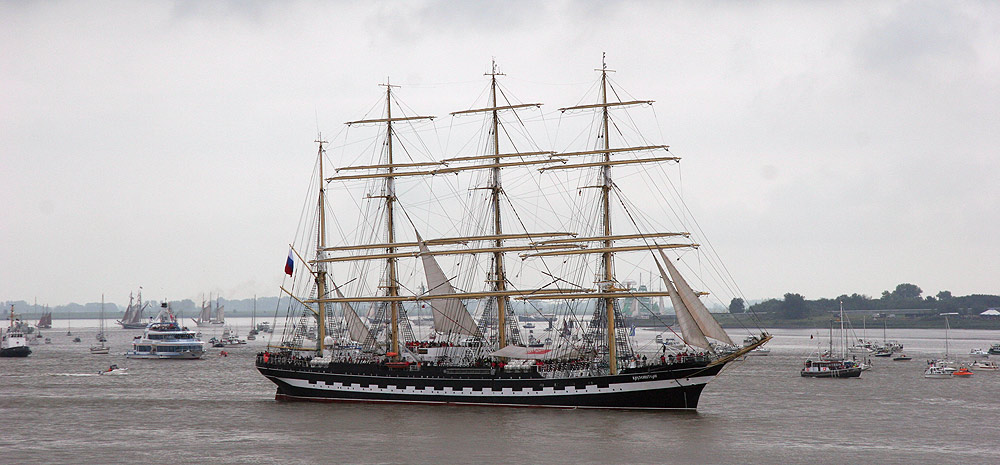
At Sail Bremerhaven 2005

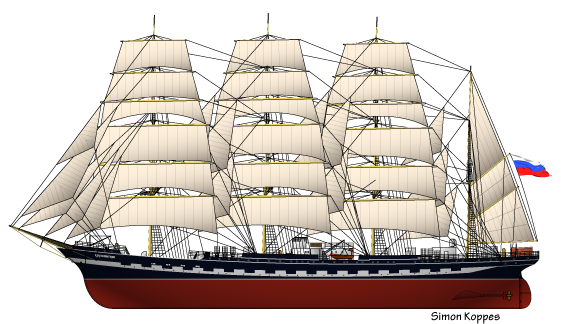
Line art of Kruzenshtern

In 1976, Kruzenshtern sailed in the Tall Ships race from Bermuda to Newport and participated in Operation Sail in New York harbor during the United States Bicentennial. Sailors on some of the other ships wondered about her speed and suspected that the captain was occasionally turning on her engines to gain an advantage and called her the "Dieselshtern".

In January 1981 she was transferred to the "Estonian Fisheries Industry" at Tallinn and in 1991 she became part of the "State Baltic Academy of the Fisheries" fleet with her new home port in Kaliningrad.

Kruzenshtern takes part in international regattas. After the dissolution of the Soviet Union funding became a problem, so passengers are carried for that purpose. In 1995–96 she circumnavigated the world in the trail of her namesake. She again sailed around the world in 2005–06 to commemorate the 200th anniversary of Krusenstern's circumnavigation.

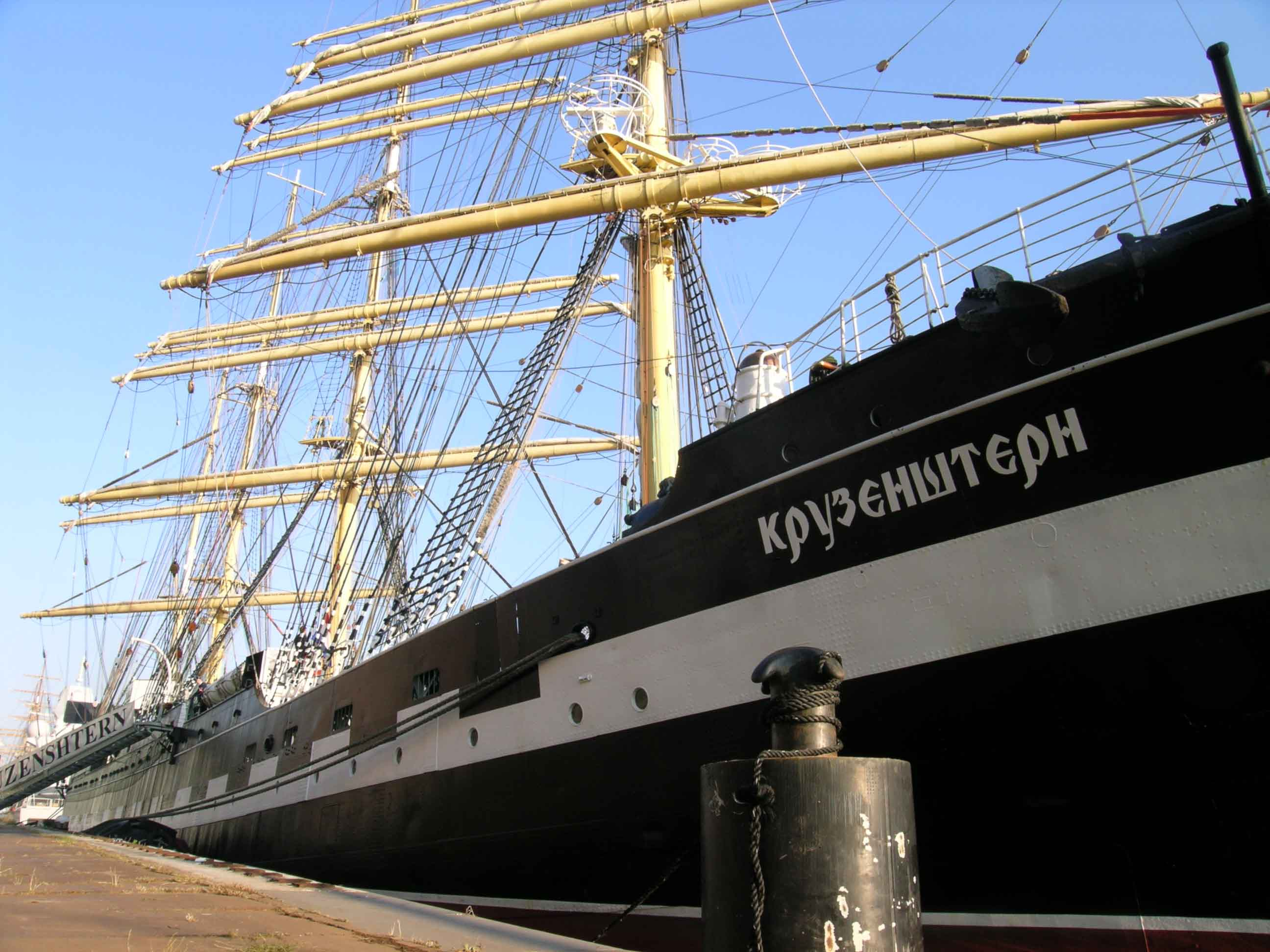
Крузенштерн at SAIL Amsterdam 2005

On 23 June 2009 while she was en route to the Charleston, South Carolina Harborfest, her foremast was damaged in a storm off Bermuda when the sail backed and snapped the mast.

On 3 May 2010 she stopped in Bremerhaven after a trip of five months with stops in Vancouver for the 2010 Winter Olympics and in Cuba, after which she returned to Kaliningrad. On 4 August 2014, Kruzenshtern sank the tug Diver Master at Esbjerg, Denmark when a line between the two vessels failed to release. On 11 June 2015, she rammed the two Icelandic Coastguard patrol ships Þór and Týr. Both vessels sustained damage. On 27 June, she ran aground at Arkhangelsk. She was refloated that day.

== Trivia ==
The ship has been one of the main attractions during the Norwegian Constitution Day celebration in Larvik, Vestfold.

== See also ==
- List of large sailing vessels
