= F. Laeisz =

German shipping company

- Type: Partnership
- Industry: Shipping, trade, insurance
- Founded: Hamburg, Germany (March 24, 1824)
- Founder: Ferdinand Laeisz
- Headquarters: Hamburg, Germany
- Number of locations: 4 locations (Hamburg, Rostock, Bremerhaven and Grabow)
- Owner: Nikolaus W. Schües, Nikolaus H. Schües (CEO)
- Number of employees: 1,250
- Website: www.laeisz.de

F. Laeisz (/laɪs/ LYSSE; short form FL) is a German shipping company with offices in Hamburg, Rostock, Bremerhaven and Grabow, Germany, as well as Japan and the Philippines.

== History ==
The firm was established by Ferdinand Laeisz on 24 March 1824 as a production company for tall hats. Expansion to overseas markets in 1839 enabled him to purchase the brig "Carl", named after his son, who joined the firm as a partner on 1 March 1852. In 1857 the first new build was commissioned, a wooden barque named "Pudel" after Carl's wife.

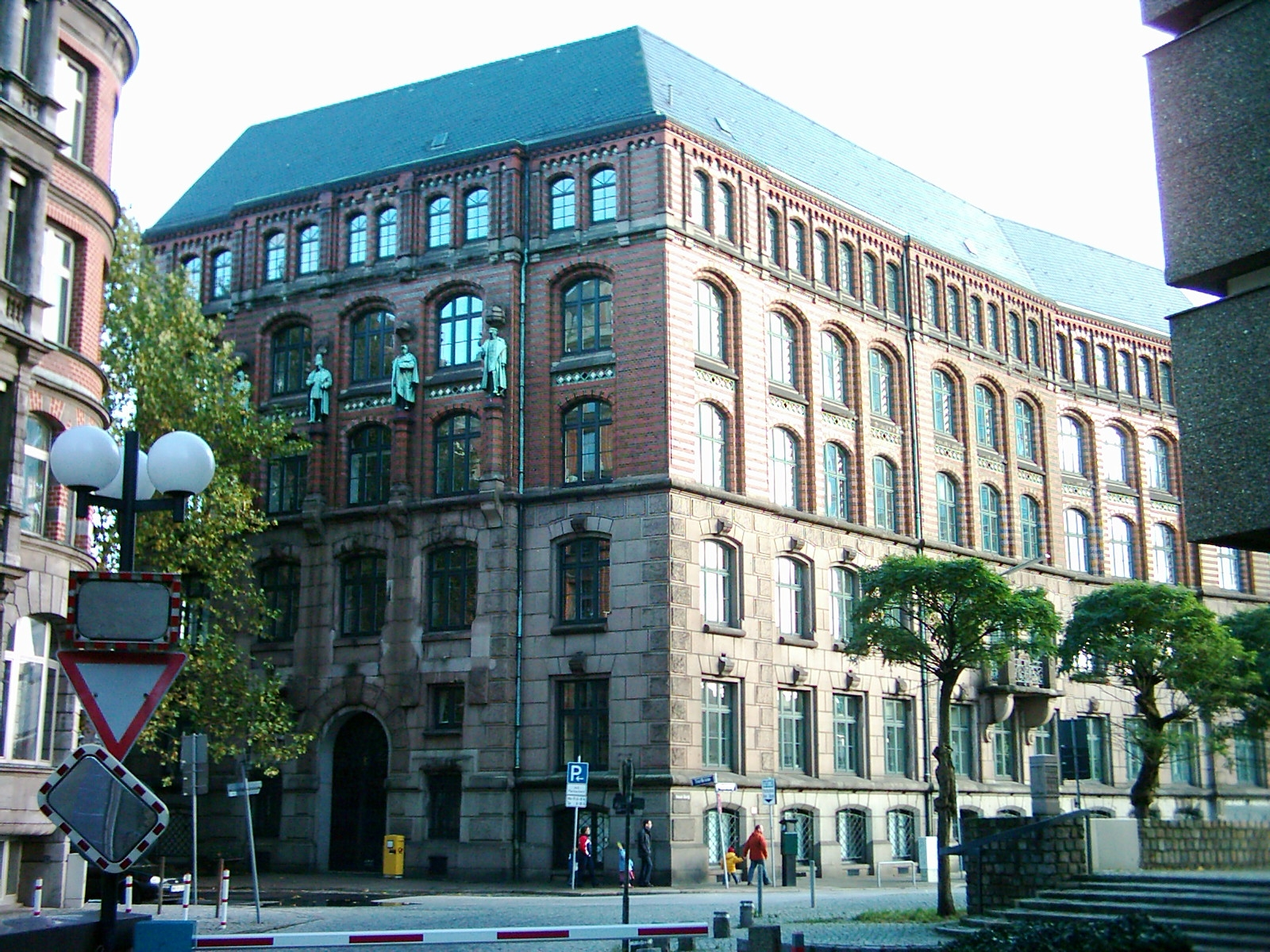
Laeiszhof/headquarter

All following new builds after 1861 were christened with names starting with a "P", which is why British seamen called the company the "P-Line".

1892 Ferdinand purchased the company's first iron steamship (Hamburg, renamed Naxos) from the Hamburg-Südamerikanischen Dampfschifffahrts-Gesellschaft (co-founded by Laeisz 1871) which was employed by Deutsche Levante Linie (DLL, co-founded by Laeisz 1889). A market position developed through establishing further steamship lines (like 1847 co-founder Hapag, 1874 co-founder Deutsch-Australische Dampfschifffahrtsgesellschaft, 1886 co-founder Woermann-Linie, 1890 co-founder Deutsch-Ost-Afrika-Linie).

The companies traded with steamships while F. Laeisz continued the tall ship tradition which generated revenue with the nitrate trade from Chile. Until the end of the 1920s the company kept its engagement in the Chile trade with nitrate until it became possible to produce nitrate by the Haber-Bosch-System and the Chile trade came to an end.

In 1897/98 the Laeiszhof was built at Trostbrücke 1 in Hamburg, the head office of the company.

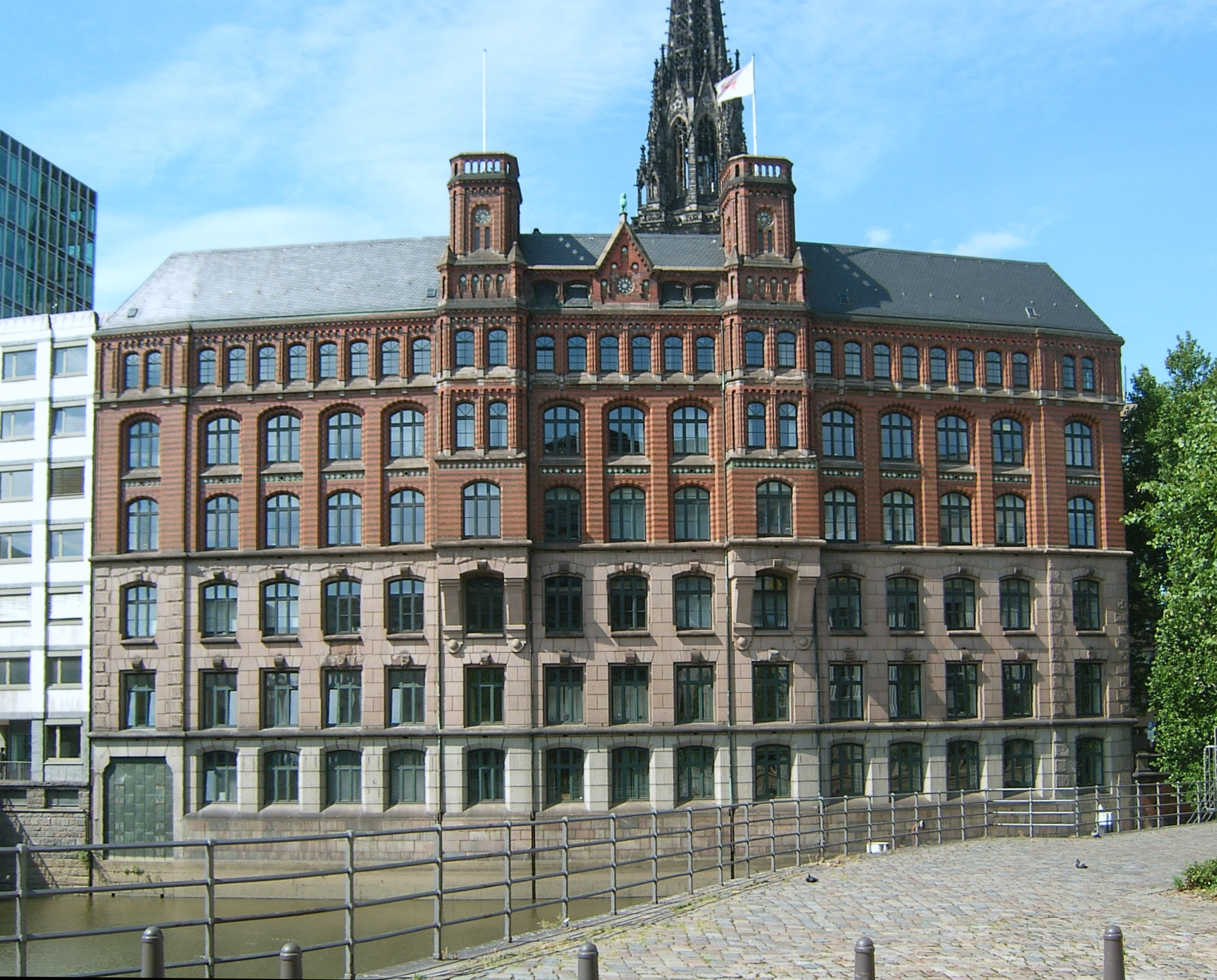
Laeiszhof Trostbrücke 1, at Hamburg-Altstadt

In 1914 the first banana reefer ships, "Pioneer" and "Pungo", were ordered for the Afrikanische Frucht-Companie established in 1912 by F. Laeisz. The outbreak of World War I made it impossible for the company to commission these two ships for employment in its own banana trade. In 1923 with "Poseidon" F. Laeisz commissioned its first steamer for its own liner service to the SAWC and 1926 the last four-masted barque Padua was built. This ship signaled the end of the Flying P-Liner area which terminated with the end of World War II when "Padua" was given to the USSR, still trading as "Krusenstern".

Since 1904 the company has owned shares in the Brazilian BRAHMA, forerunner of the brewery AMBEV. The shares were confiscated by the Brazilian government in 1942 as security for war damages.

After Paul Ganssauge (1924), Willi Ganssauge (1936) and Nikolaus W. Schües (1973) and their families became partners of the Laeisz family, in 1982 the newly established F. Laeisz Schiffahrtsgesellschaft mbH + Co. took over all shipping activities owing to a severe shipping crisis. Owners of the new company are Schües and – for a few years - F. Laeisz.

2004 Schües purchased the 1824 founded partnership F. Laeisz with all legal rights of its history. Reederei F. Laeisz, Rostock, is today the operating company, F. Laeisz GmbH, Hamburg, functions as holding company.

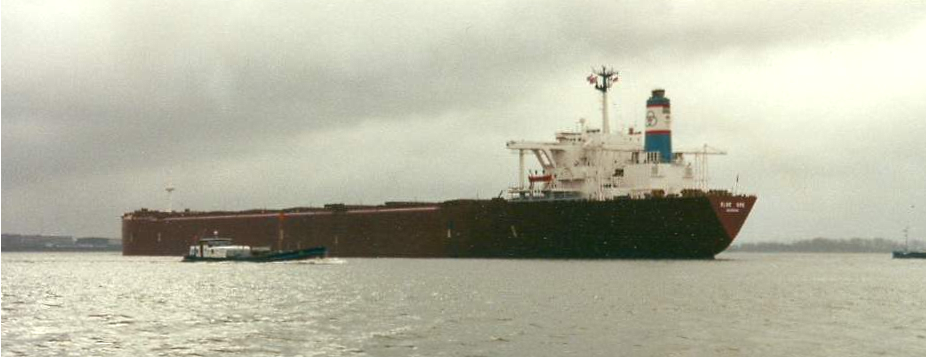
The bulk carrier Peene Ore on the river Elbe in February 2000

Today the company operates container ships, bulk carriers, gas- and car carriers as well as research vessels for the German government (AWI). Almost all ships are named with the P-names. MV "Peene Ore" the company's flagship, is the largest vessel flying the German flag.

January 2005 the Musikhalle Hamburg is again called "Laeiszhalle". Carl Laeisz had instructed the company in his will to pay 1.2 Million Mark for the construction of a music hall, his widow Sophie increased the amount in 1907 by 40% to finish the building. When in 1908 the building was opened it was the largest and most modern concert hall in Germany and was known as Laeiszhalle until 1933.

== See also ==
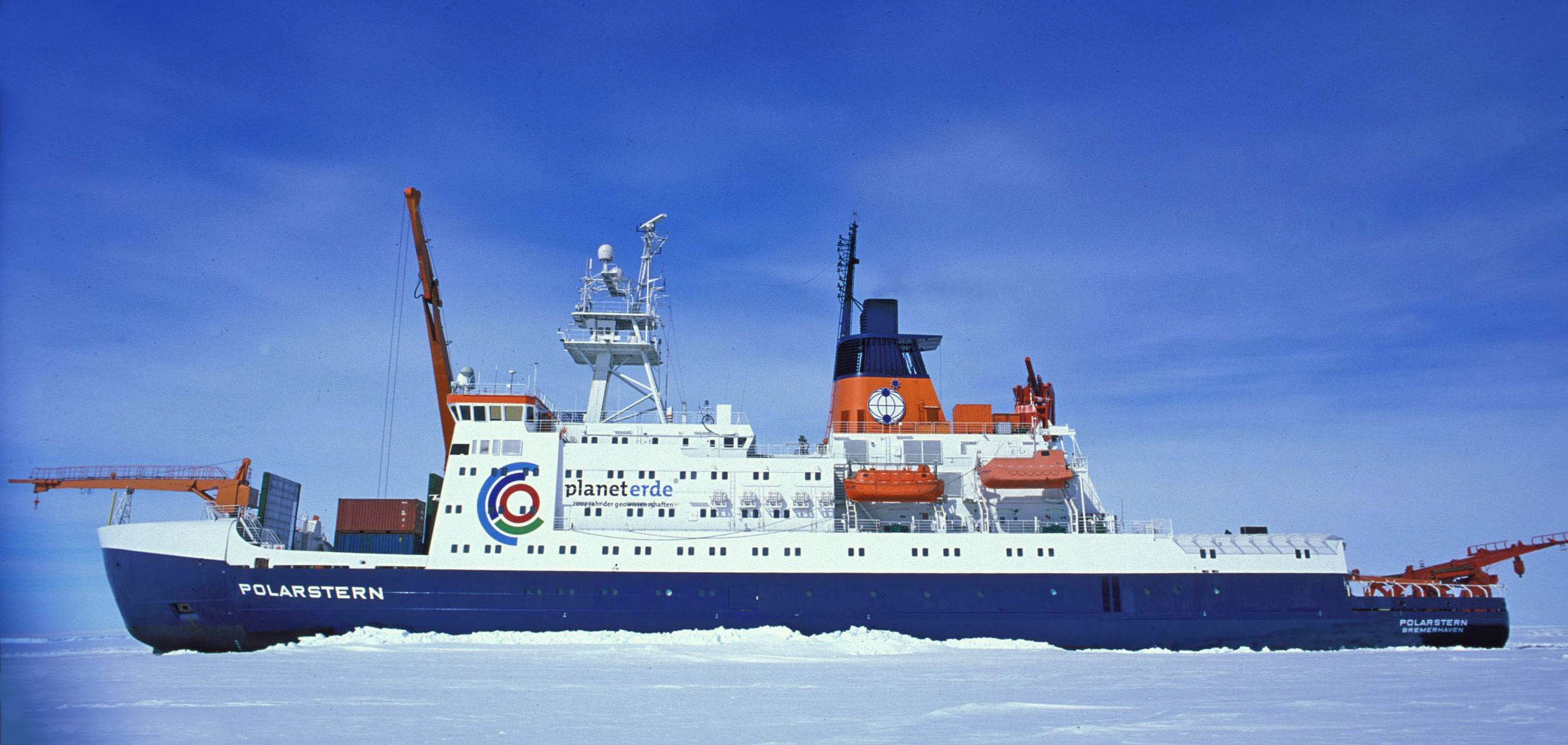
research vessel Polarstern, managed by F. Laeisz

- Flying P-Liner

== Literature ==
- Peter Klingbeil: Die Flying P-Liner. Die Segelschiffe der Reederei F. Laeisz. Verlag "Die Hanse", Hamburg 1998 u. 2000, ISBN 3-434-52562-9.
- Hans Georg Prager: "F. Laeisz" vom Frachtsegler bis zum Bulk Carrier. Koehlers Verlagsgesellschaft mbH, Herford 1974, ISBN 3-7822-0096-9.
