= Herzogin Cecilie =

German-built four-masted barque wrecked near Salcombe

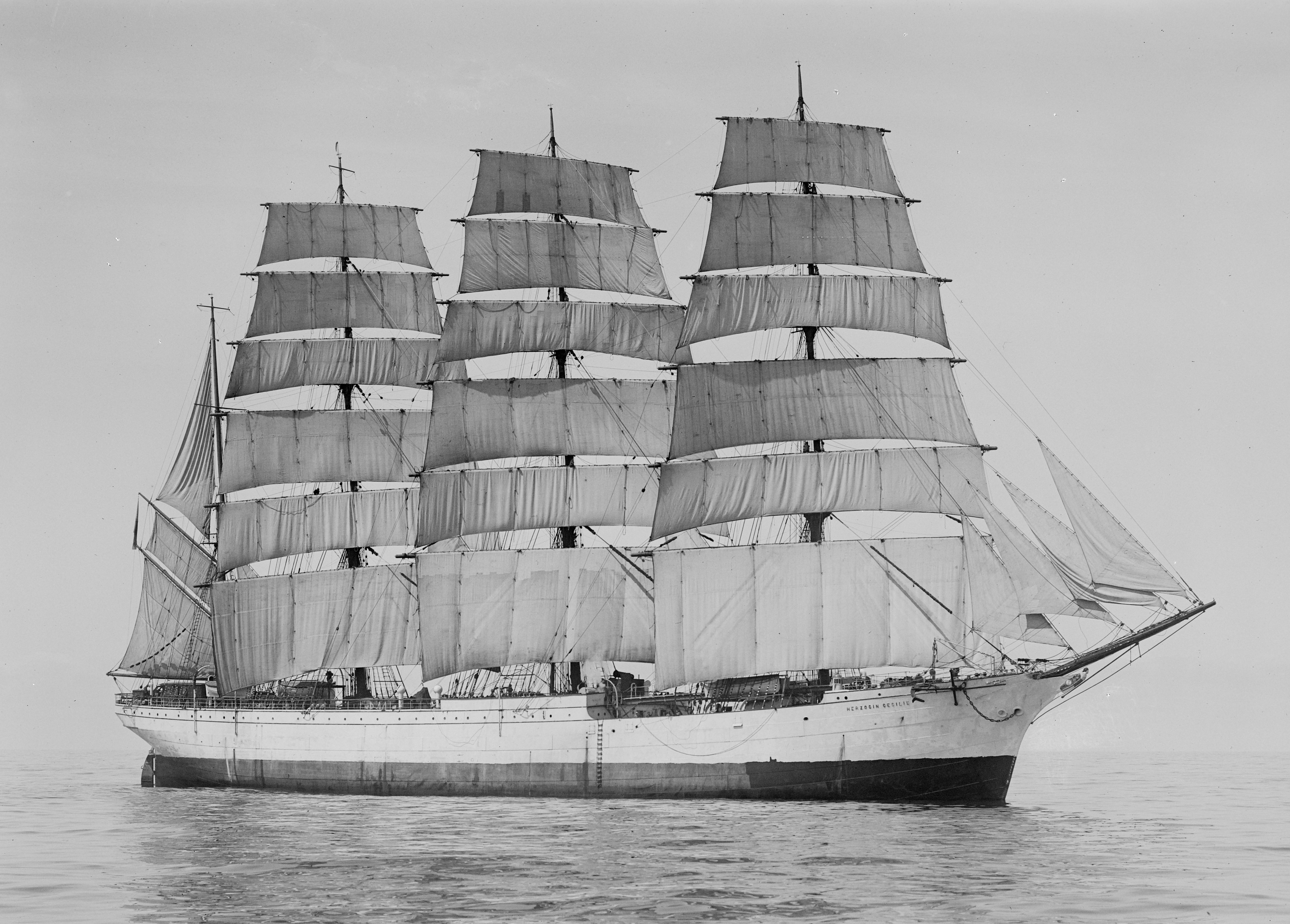
- Herzogin Cecilie

History
- Name: Herzogin Cecilie
- Owner: Norddeutscher Lloyd (1902– ); French Government ( –1920); Gustaf Erikson (1920–36)
- Port of registry: Germany (1902–20); France (1920); (Finland) Mariehamn (1921)
- Builder: Rickmers Schiffbau AG, Bremerhaven
- Yard number: 122
- Launched: 22 April 1902
- Completed: 7 June 1902
- Out of service: 25 April 1936
- Identification: Finnish Official Number 703; Code Letters TPMK (1930–36)
- Fate: Sank, 25 April 1936

General characteristics
- Tonnage: 3,242 gross register tons (GRT); 2,786 NRT
- Length: 334 ft 8 in (102.01 m)
- Beam: 46 ft 3 in (14.10 m)
- Height: 175 ft 6 in (53.49 m)
- Draught: 24 ft 2 in (7.37 m)
- Propulsion: sails
- Sail plan: 4-masted barque, 38,000 square feet (3,530 m^{2}) sail area
- Crew: 81 (Norddeutscher Lloyd); 31 (Gustaf Erikson)

Herzogin Cecilie was a German-built four-mast barque (windjammer), named after German Crown Princess Duchess Cecilie of Mecklenburg-Schwerin (1886–1954), spouse of Crown Prince Wilhelm of Prussia (1882–1951) (Herzogin being German for Duchess). She sailed under German, French and Finnish flags.

== History ==
Herzogin Cecilie was built in 1902 by Rickmers Schiffbau AG in Bremerhaven. She was yard number 122 and was launched on 22 April 1902. Completion was on 7 June that year. She was 334 feet 8 inches (102.01 m) long, with a breadth of 46 feet 3 inches (14.10 m) and a draught of 24 feet 2 inches (7.37 m). Herzogin Cecilie was built for Norddeutscher Lloyd Bremen. Unlike other contemporary German merchant sailing ships, the black Flying-P-Liners or the green ships of Rickmers, she was painted in white. She was one of the fastest windjammers ever built, logging 21 knots at Skagen.

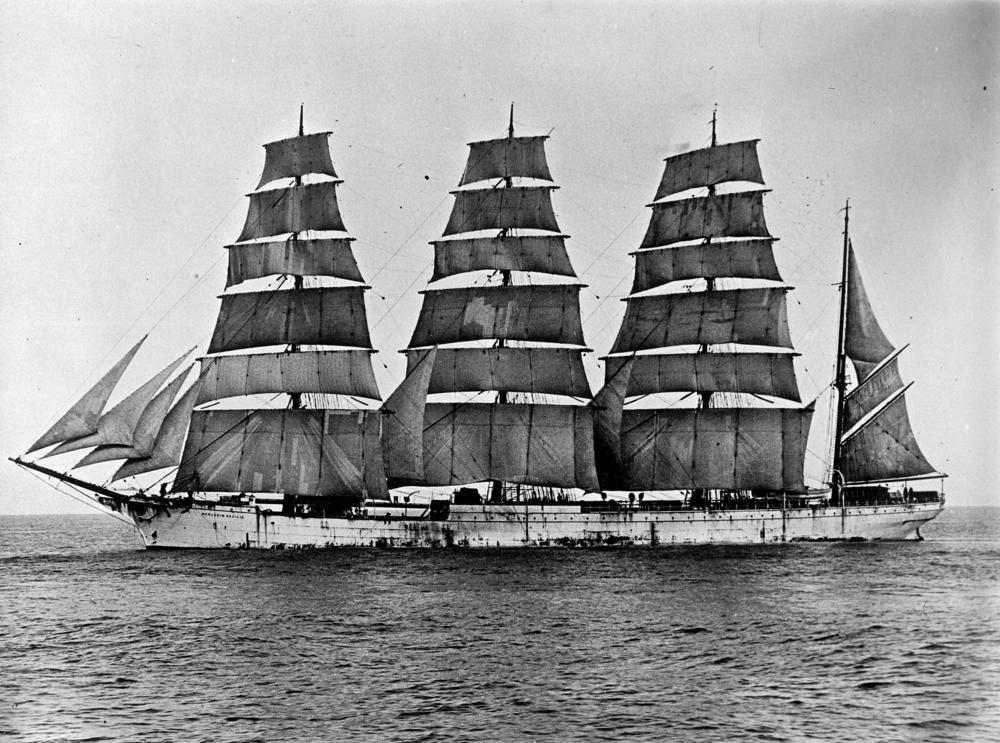
Herzogin Cecilie, photographed at Queensland, Australia

The tall ships of the time remained competitive against the steamers only on the longer trade routes: the Chilean nitrate trade, carrying saltpeter from Chile to Europe, and the Australian wheat trade, carrying grain from Australia to Europe. Both routes required rounding Cape Horn routinely, and were not well suited for steamers, as coal was in short supply there.

Herzogin Cecilie was one of the fastest merchant sailing ships of her time, on a par with the Flying-P-Liners. The trip around Cape Horn from Portland (Oregon) to The Lizard (England) was done in 1903 in only 106 days.

At the outbreak of World War I, she was interned by Chile, returning to Germany in 1920, only to be given to France as reparation, and subsequently sold to Gustaf Erikson (24 October 1872 – 15 August 1947) of Finland for £4250. She was homeported at Mariehamn.

As the freight rates for saltpeter had dropped after the war, Gustaf Erikson sent her to bring grain from Australia. In so-called grain races, several tall ships tried to arrive first in Europe, to sell their cargo for a higher price, as told, for example, in The Great Tea Race of 1866 or The Last Grain Race. Typically, ships were loaded in the Spencer Gulf area, Port Victoria, South Australia, or Wallaroo, South Australia, and travelled to Europe, with ports on the British Isles like Queenstown, Ireland, or Falmouth, Cornwall, being considered as the finish. The ship also passed by Queensland where she was photographed.

After "winning" four times prior to 1921, she again won the grain race four times in eleven trips from 1926 to 1936.

In 1927, Herzogin Cecilie covered Port Lincoln (South Australia) to Falmouth, London, and won a race against the Swedish ship Beatrice. Alan Villiers was on board, which would result in his book Falmouth for Orders, and later a trip aboard the barque Parma. In 1928 the ship again raced for grain. While in Port Lincoln, a 22-year old music teacher disguised herself as a boy and stowed away on the ship. When she emerged from thirst 3 days out from the coast, the ship could not return her. The superstitious crew thought the race could not be won with a woman on board. The ship sailed East via Cape Horn and won the race.

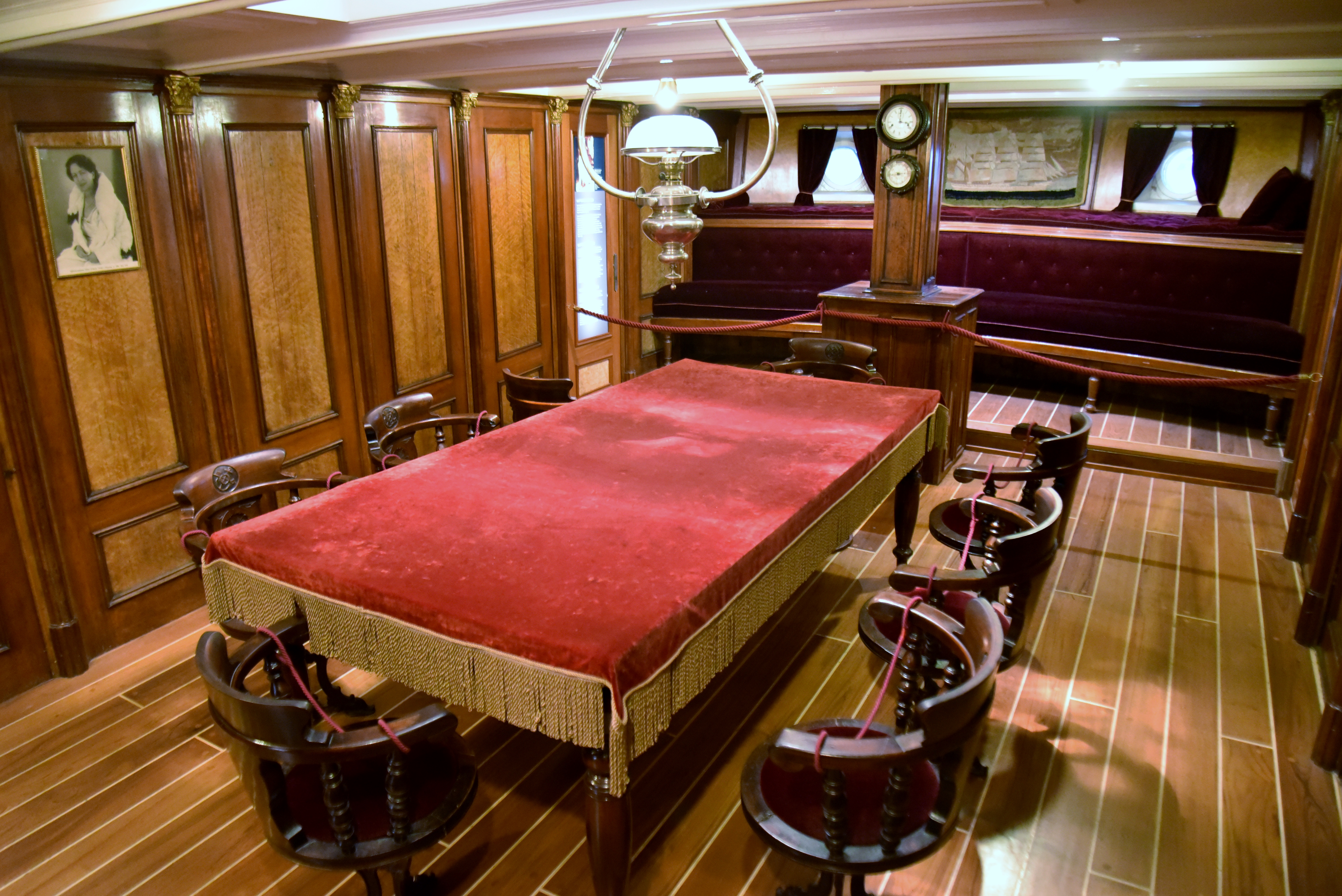
The restored captain's saloon, in the Åland Maritime Museum

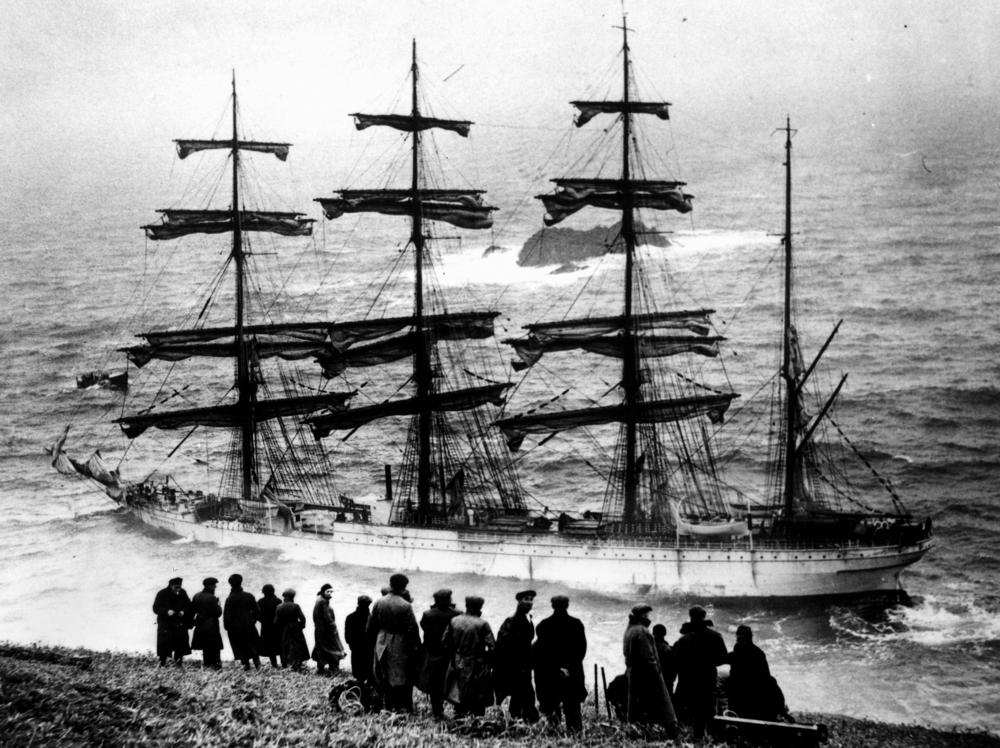
Wreck of the Herzogin Cecilie

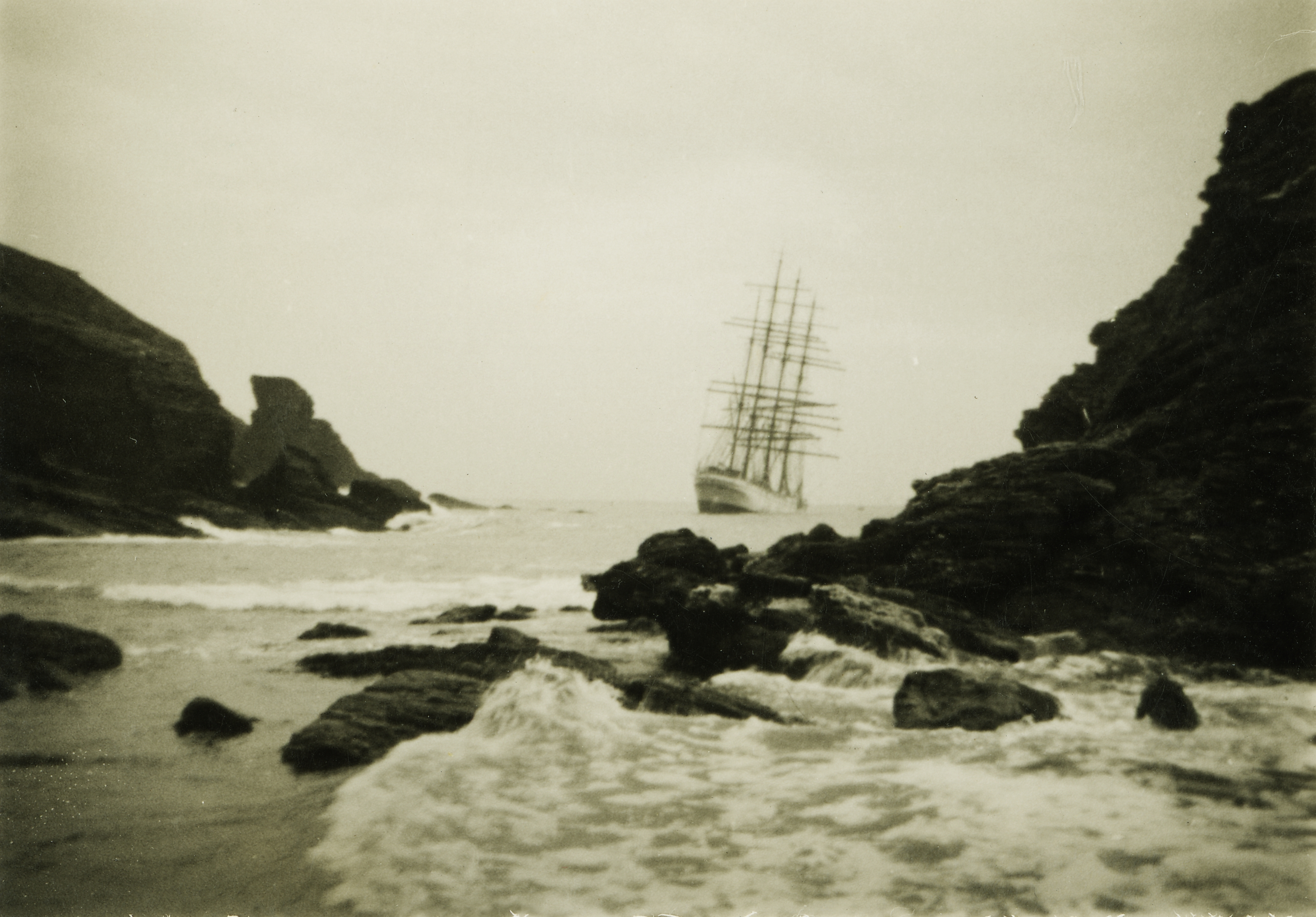
Wreck of the Herzogin Cecilie in south Devon

With Sven Erikson as her captain and Elis Karlsson her first mate, the ship left Port Lincoln in South Australia on 21 January 1935, with a cargo of wheat, and after taking a more southerly route than usual, reached Falmouth for Orders on 18 May, making her passage of 86 days the second fastest ever. Herzogin Cecilie was making for Ipswich in dense fog, when, on 25 April 1936, she grounded on Ham Stone Rock and drifted onto the cliffs of Bolt Head on the south Devon coast. After parts of the cargo were unloaded, she was floating again, only to be towed in June 1936 to Starhole (Starehole) Bay at the mouth of the nearby Kingsbridge Estuary near Salcombe, and beached there. On 18 January 1939, the ship capsized and sank. The remains of the ship sit at a depth of 7 metres at 50°12.82′N 3°47.02′W.

The timber and brass portholes from the chart room were salvaged and used to construct a small room in the Cottage Hotel at Hope Cove, which can still be visited today. The room contains several photographs and press cuttings of the wreck. There is also a collection of items from the ship in a small museum at Sven Eriksson's family home at Pellas, in Lemland, on the Åland Islands of Finland. The restored captain's saloon, which the owner salvaged before the ship was abandoned, was installed in the Åland Maritime Museum in Mariehamn, Finland.

The ship and her last voyage were memorialized in a folk song by Ken Stephens, Herzogin Cecile.

== Official numbers and code letters ==
Official Numbers were a forerunner to IMO Numbers. Herzogin Cecilie had the Finnish Official Number 703 and used the Code Letters TPMK.

== Music ==
- "Herzogin Cecile" was recorded by the American quintet Bounding Main and released on their 2006 album Lost at Sea.

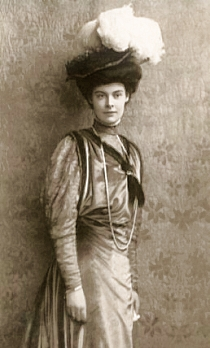
Duchess Cecilie, Crown Princess of Prussia, in 1908, for whom the vessel was named.

== See also ==
- Grain race

== Sources ==
- Peter Pedersen and Joseph Conrad (1989). Strandung und Schiffbruch. Mit Entscheidungen der Seeämter des Deutschen Reiches. Bechtemünz Verlag: Augsburg. ISBN 3-86047-245-3
- Fred Schmidt and Dietrich Reimer (1942). Schiffe und Schicksale. Andrews & Steiner: Berlin.
- Clamp, Arthur L., The Loss of the Herzogin Cecilie on Ham Stone 25th, Plymouth
- Colton, J. Ferrell, Loss of the "Herzogin Cecilie", Sea Breezes Vol. 65 No. 536, August 1990 p. 586
- Cormack, Neil W., Herzogin Cecilie, The Flagship of the Gustaf Erikson Fleet of Mariehamn: 1921–1936, N.W. Cormack 1996, ISBN 0-646-29834-8
- Cresswell, John P., The Loss of the Herzogin Cecilie, Artscape, Cornwall 1994
- Darch, Malcolm, Herzogin Cecilie, the story of her charthouse 1936–1988. Ålands Sjöfart & Handel 5/88 s. 272–273
- Lindfors, Harald, Round The Horn in the Herzogin Cecilie in 1922, Ålands Sjöfart 2/76 s. 56–59
- McNeill, Robert B., Beatrice vs. Herzogin Cecilie, A most Curious "Race Round the Horn", New York 2001, Exxon Mobil Marine Lubricants. Volume LXXI, No. 1, 2001, of The Compass, The Magazine of the Sea. 32 PP with b/w and colour illustrations.
- Tod, Giles M.S., Herzogin Cecilie gets in a "Breeze", Sea Breezes Vol. XIX. No. 189 August 1935
- Alan Villiers, Falmouth for Orders. The Story of the Last Clipper Ship Race around Cape Horn, Geoffrey Bles, London 1929
- Alan Villiers, The Cape Horn Grain-ship Race, Washington. 1933, National Geographic Magazine. Extract from: volume LXIII, No.1, January 1933.39 pp., with 38 b/w photos (13 on full page).
- Alan Villiers, Last of Windships
- Pamela Eriksson, The Duchess. (1958), Secker and Warburg, London.
- Pamela Bourne, Out of The World. (1935), Geoffrey Bles, London.
- Elis Karlsson, Pully Haul
- Elis Karlsson, Mother Sea. (1964) Oxford University Press, London.
- W.L. Leclercq, Wind in de Zeilen
- Elisabeth Rogge-Ballehr, Schule der See Viermastbark Herzogin Cecilie
- W.L.A. Derby, The Tall Ships Pass
- Basil Greenhill and John Hackmann, Herzogin Cecilie. (1991), Conway Maritime Press Ltd, London.
- Harold A. Underhill, Sail Training and Cadet Ships
