= Grain race =

Sailing race from Australia to England

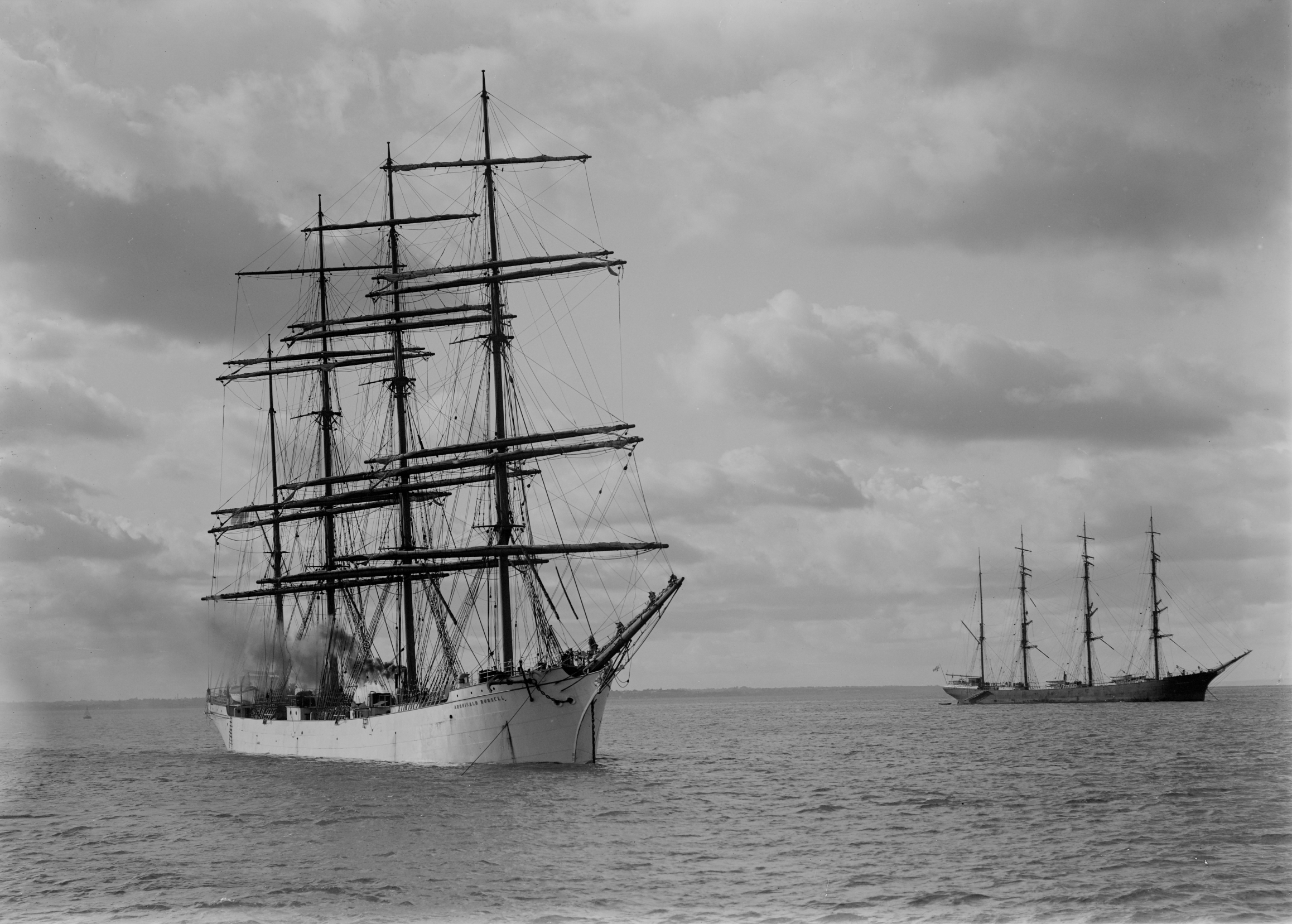
Archibald Russell and Ponape, two windjammers that sailed on the grain trade.

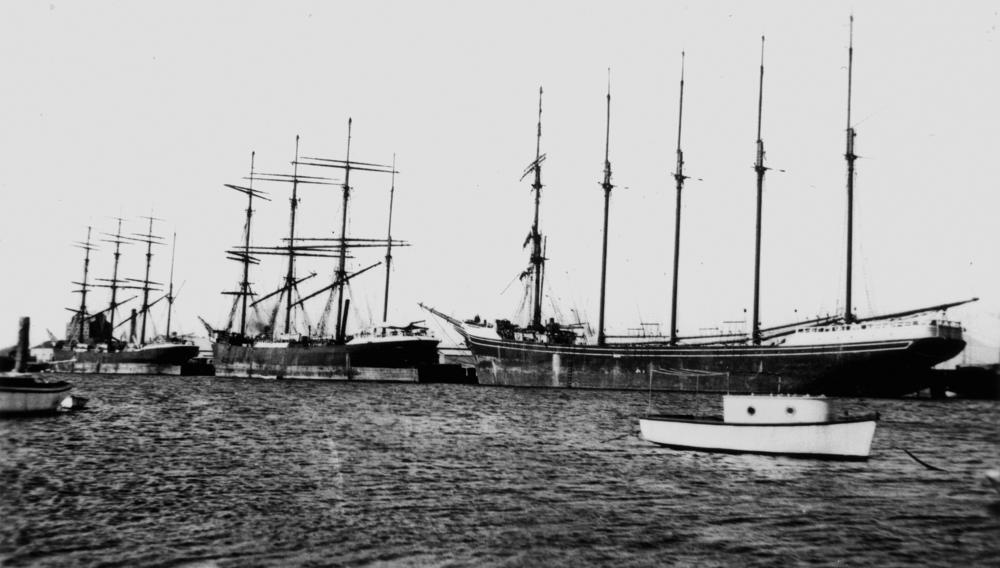
In Queensland.

Grain Race or The Great Grain Race was the informal name for the annual windjammer sailing season generally from South Australia's grain ports on Spencer Gulf to Lizard Point, Cornwall on the southwesternmost coast of the United Kingdom, or to specific ports. A good, fast passage Australia-to-England via Cape Horn was considered anything under 100 days.

== The races ==
The cargo was grain, usually wheat. The sailing ships which loaded in Spencer Gulf from January to June were, in a broader context, "vivid evidence that South Australia was now inextricably bound into the rapidly developing global network of the wheat trade." The masters of the square-rigged grain carriers engaged in unofficial competition who would sail fastest across the southern ocean, around Cape Horn and up the Atlantic. While the race was informal, it was a source of betting and prestige. The competition gathered so much attention that in 1928 the International Paint company donated a silver cup for the fastest passage.

The ship with most victories was the four-masted barque Herzogin Cecilie at six times. The fastest ship was Parma in 1933 in 83 days, and the events of the voyage are described by the captain's apprentice, Betty Jacobsen, in her book A Girl Before the Mast. The grain trade "flourished through the 1930s and reached its peak in 1939." That year thirteen windjammers rode at anchor off Port Victoria. "With the exception of two German ships, all ... flew the flag of the Gustaf Erikson Line and the pale blue Finnish cross."

== The last race ==
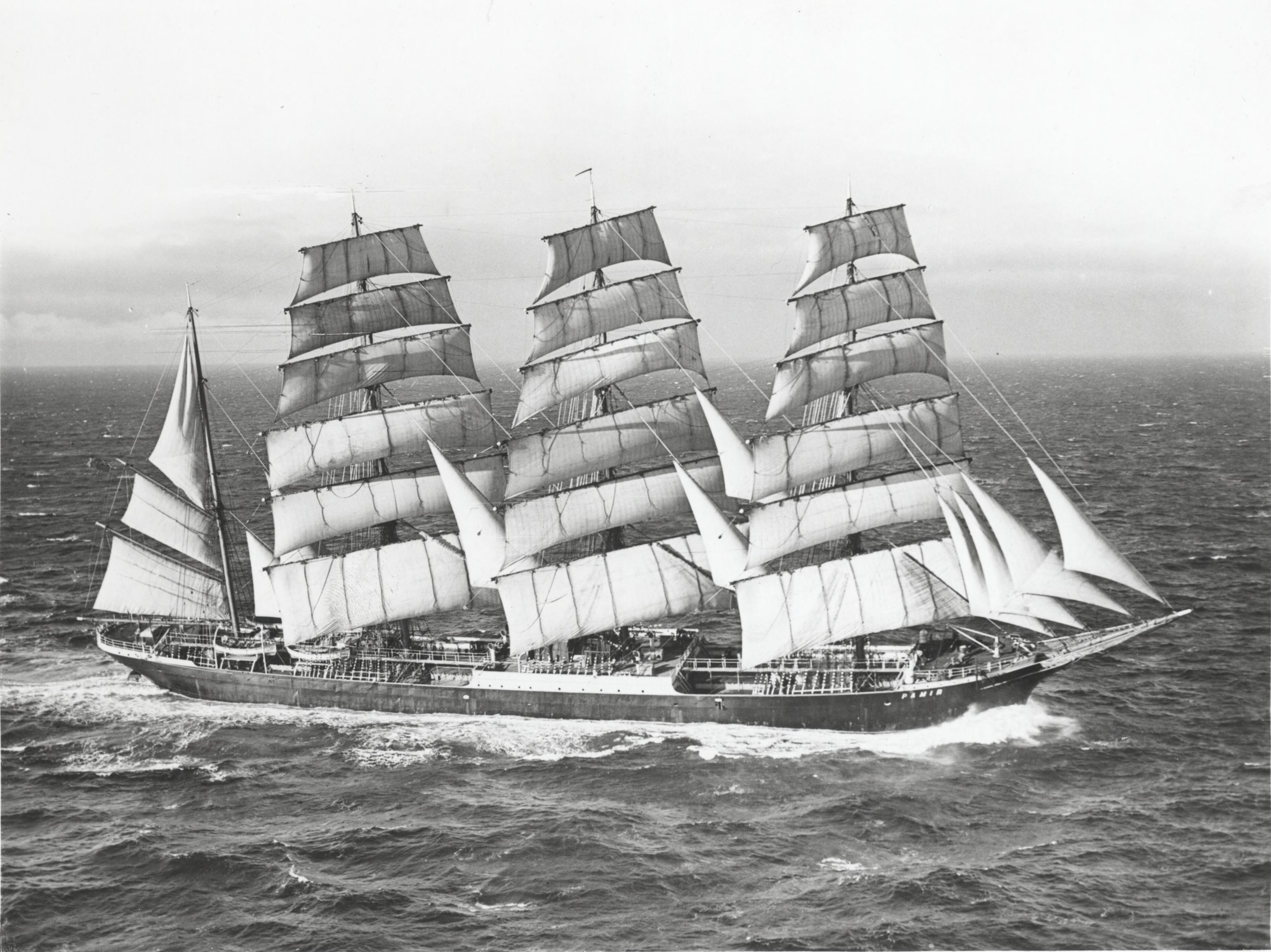
Pamir at the entrance to the English Channel.

The last of the Grain Races was in 1949. Pamir (Captain Verner Björkfelt), fully loaded with 60,000 sacks of Australian barley for distilleries in Scotland, set sail at Port Victoria on 28 May 1949, rounded Cape Horn on 11 July, passed Lizard Point on 2 October and arrived at Falmouth just beyond it in 128 days. Passat (Captain Ivar Hägerstrand) left Port Victoria four days after Pamir, but passed Pamir somewhere in the Roaring Forties of the southern Pacific Ocean on the 6,000 mile run to Cape Horn, and arrived at Penarth Dock South Wales after 110 days. However, it bestowed on Pamir the honor of being the last windjammer with a commercial load to round Cape Horn.

== Public perception and reality in retrospect ==
While the general public thought of the wheat trade as the Grain Race, "there was no compelling economic reason to be first home with a cargo of grain, and the [ship] owners severely discouraged racing by their officers (although they did not mind if their ship arrived ahead of another)." Racing in the gale-force winds of the Roaring Forties and around Cape Horn meant straining ships and losing sails and gear, and it meant the expense of repairing or replacing those damages and losses. "Unlike the hell-bent racing captains of the celebrated tea-clippers of the 1860s ... the captain of a grain ship who lost gear more likely would lose his job."

== Grain races 1921–1949 ==
Year	Winning ship	Flag	Days	Route
1921	Marlborough Hill	Finland	91	Port Lincoln–Cobh
1922	Milverton	Finland	90	Melbourne–London
1923	Beatrice	Sweden	88	Melbourne–London
1924	Greif	Germany	110	Port Lincoln–Falmouth
1925	Beatrice	Sweden	103	Adelaide–Falmouth
1926	L'Avenir	Belgium	110	Geelong–Lizard
1927	Herzogin Cecilie	Finland	98	Port Lincoln–Cobh
1928	Herzogin Cecilie	Finland	96	Port Lincoln–Falmouth
1929	Archibald Russell	Finland	93	Melbourne–Cobh
1930	Pommern	Finland	105	Wallaroo–Falmouth
1931	Herzogin Cecilie	Finland	93	Wallaroo–Falmouth
1932	Parma	Finland	103	Port Broughton–Falmouth
	Pamir	Finland	103	Wallaroo–Cobh
1933	Parma	Finland	83	Port Victoria–Falmouth
1934	Passat	Finland	106	Wallaroo–Lizard
1935	Priwall	Germany	91	Port Victoria–Cobh
1936	Herzogin Cecilie	Finland	86	Port Lincoln–Falmouth
1937	Pommern	Finland	94	Port Victoria–Falmouth
	Passat	Finland	94	Port Victoria–Falmouth
1938	Passat	Finland	98	Port Victoria–Falmouth
1939	Moshulu	Finland	91	Port Victoria–Cobh
1948	Viking	Finland	139	Port Victoria–Falmouth
1949	Passat	Finland	110	Port Victoria to Penarth dock south wales

== See also ==
- Åland Maritime Museum
- The Last Grain Race, a 1956 book by Eric Newby on the last (1939) voyage in the Australian grain trade by Moshulu, the largest sailing ship still transporting grain at the time
