= Cutwater =

Part of a watercraft's prow or stem

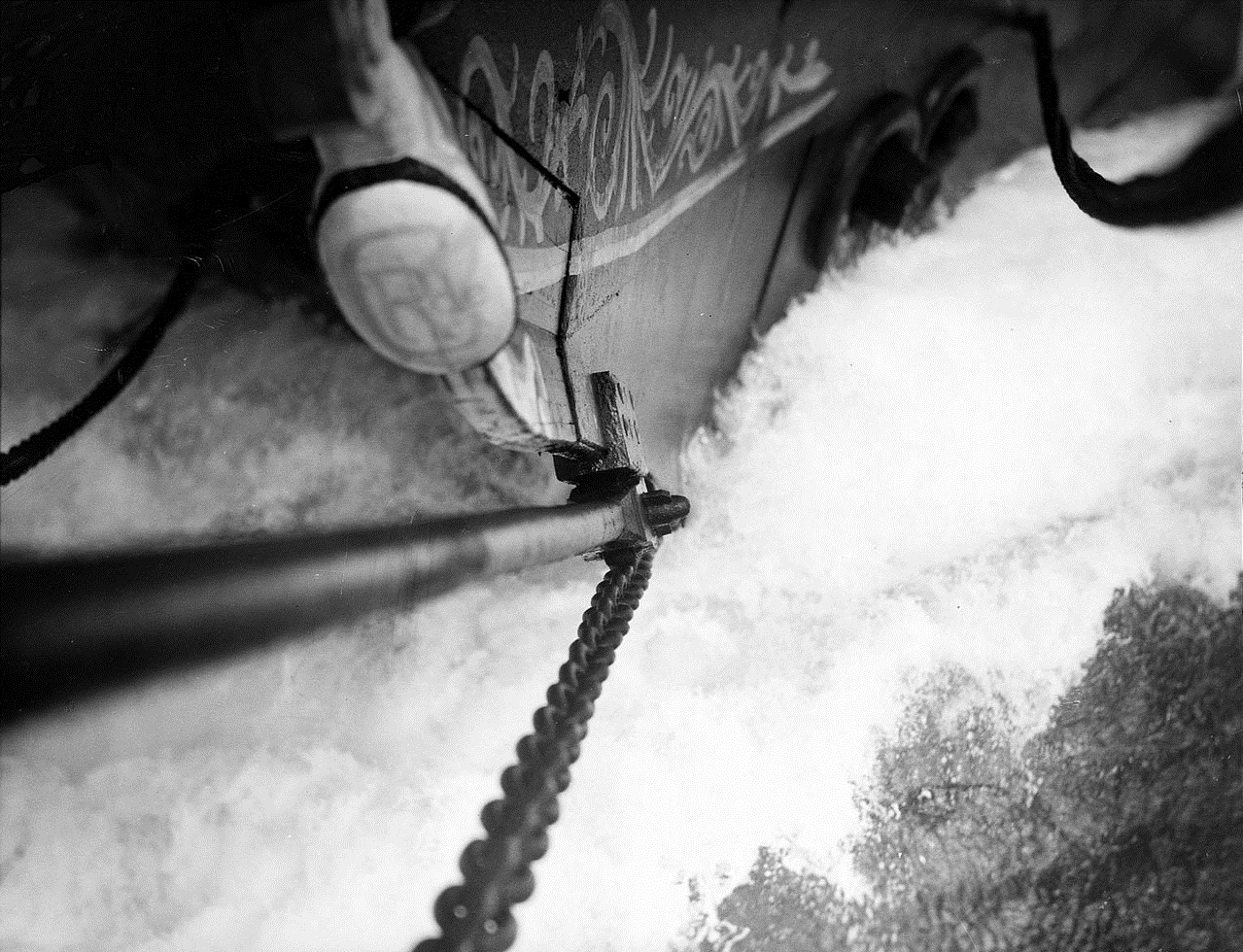
Cutwater of the barque Parma, photograph by Alan Villiers, 1932-33.

A cutwater is the forward part of the prow or stem of a watercraft around the waterline. Its purpose is to break the surface tension of the water ahead and make the vessel move through more easily.
