= Priwall =

Priwall may refer to

- Priwall Peninsula, in Germany
- Priwall (barque), a German Flying P-Liner sailing ship
