= Priwall (barque) =

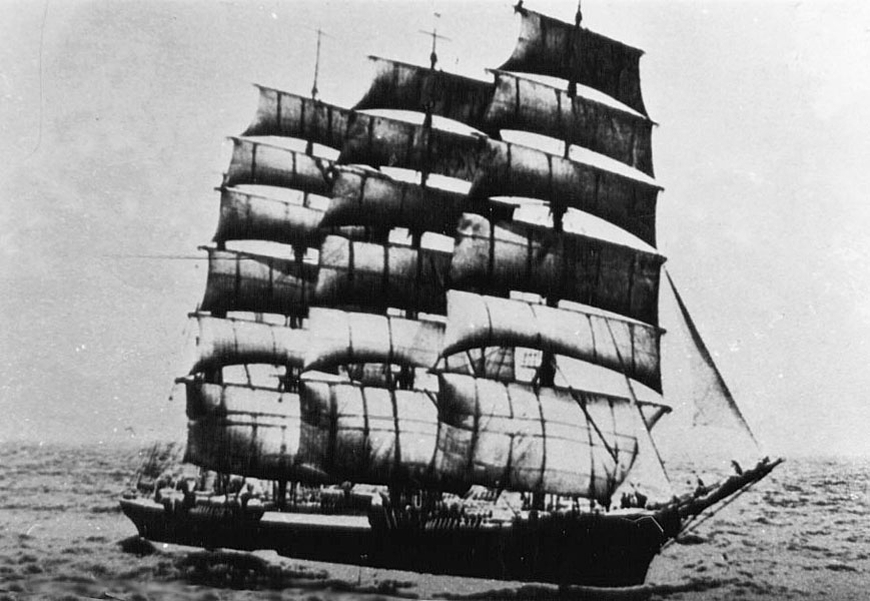

History
- Name: Priwall (1917-41); Lautaro (1941-45)
- Owner: F. Laeisz, Hamburg (1920-41); Chilean Government (1941-45)
- Operator: F. Laeisz, Hamburg (1920-41)
- Port of registry: (Weimar Republic) Hamburg (1920-33); (Germany) Hamburg (1933-41); (Chile) Chilean Navy (1941-45)
- Builder: Blohm & Voss, Hamburg
- Launched: 23 June 1917
- Completed: March 1920
- In service: 6 March 1920
- Out of service: 28 February 1945
- Identification: Code Letters RWLN (1920-33); Code Letters DIRQ (1933-41)
- Fate: Burnt out, 28 February 1945

General characteristics
- Tonnage: 3,185 GRT; 2,834 NRT; 4,800 DWT
- Length: 323 ft 1 in (98.48 m)
- Beam: 47 ft 1 in (14.35 m)
- Depth: 26 ft 3 in (8.00 m)
- Sail plan: Barque
- Speed: Recorded average of 16 knots (30 km/h) over 24 hours
- Notes: Recorded fastest ever westward rounding of Cape Horn

Priwall was a four-masted steel-hulled barque with royal sails over double top and topgallant sails. The windjammer was ordered by the F. Laeisz shipping company of Hamburg and launched at the Blohm & Voss yard, Hamburg, on 23 June 1917. After delays arising from a shortage of materials during and after First World War, she was completed on 6 March 1920. Priwall was used on the nitrate trade route to the west coast of South America; she also made several voyages from South Australia's Spencer Gulf grain ports to Europe. Her code Letters were RWLN; in 1934 they were changed to DIRQ.

== History and performance ==
While still at the builders, Priwall (with other German merchant vessels) was identified in 1919 for confiscation by the Allies as World War I reparations. However, due to the incomplete state of the ship, delivery to the Allies was not enforced and thus allowed the Laeisz company to finish construction – and, after outfitting, to operate the ship as intended, carrying general cargo outbound and nitrate or grain to Europe.

Priwall was one of the Flying P-Liners that enhanced the reputation of her owners. As with all Laeisz ships, Priwall was well maintained, and the company's captains were known as fine steersmen and bold sailors. During a 1932 voyage on Christmas Day, the ship covered 384 nautical miles (711 km) in 24 hours (an average speed of 16 knots (30 km/h)). In 1935, she 'won' the Great Grain Race by sailing from Port Victoria to Queenstown in 91 days. In 1938, Priwall recorded the fastest ever westward rounding of Cape Horn by a commercial sailing ship in five days and fourteen hours under Captain Adolf Hauth.

Her final voyage under Laeisz ownership commenced on 23 May 1939 at Hamburg, bound for Valparaíso. During the voyage, on a rare mid-ocean meeting in the South Atlantic, Priwall passed by the Finnish barque Lawhill en route from South Australia to Europe with a cargo of grain; Priwall also sighted the liner Cap Arcona. The ship rounded Cape Horn on 21 July in the gale-force winds of the southern winter as the last commercial windjammer completing this east-to-west passage, and reached the sheltered anchorage of Corral, Chile. There the crew maneuvered the mizzen upper top yard to the foremast to replace its broken upper top yard. Continuing on to Talcahuano to off-load freight, she finally arrived at Valparaíso on 3 September 1939. Priwall was then interned at Valparaíso at the onset of the Second World War. In 1941, to avoid potential seizure by the Allies, the ship was deeded as a gift to the Republic of Chile in a ceremony attended by the Governor of Valparaíso, Mr. Alfredo Rodríguez Mac-Iver. Renamed Lautaro, she was used as a cargo carrying training ship by the Chilean Navy. On 28 February 1945, while loading nitrate, she caught fire off the Peruvian coast and was destroyed.

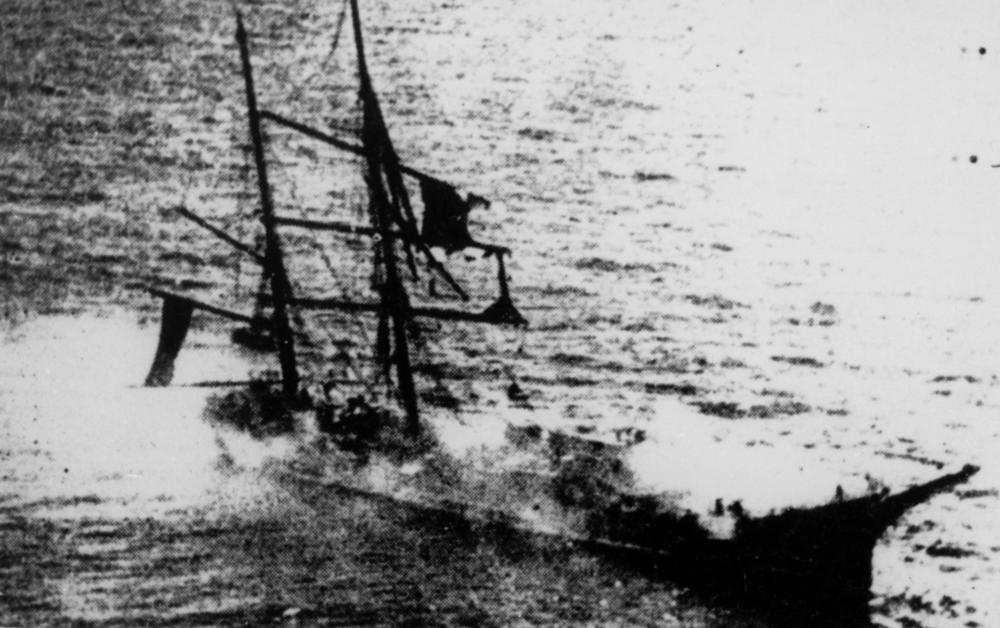
Lautaro ex Priwall, loaded with nitrate, burning north of Iquique on February 28th 1945

On 8 March 1945 the SV Lautaro sank while being towed by the SS Ucayali, which was trying to move the ship to Callao, north of Iquique.

== Captains ==
F. Laeisz Shipping Company:

- Jürgen Jürs (1920–21)
- Carl Brockhöft (1921–24)
- Jürgen Jürs (1925–28)
- K. Schubert (1928–29)
- H. Töpper (1930–31)
- Robert Clauß (1932–35)
- Jürgen Jürs (1935–36)
- Adolf Hauth (1937–1939)

== Voyages ==
Voyages made by Priwall under Laeisz ownership:

From	To	Time (days)	Year
Cuxhaven, Germany	San Antonio, Chile	76	1923
Pisagua, Chile	Cuxhaven	128	1923–24
Hamburg	Talcahuano, Chile	99	1928
Hamburg	Talcahuano	94	1928–29
Iquique, Chile	Dunkirk, France		1929
Hamburg	Talcahuano	89	1930
Mejillones, Chile	Brügge, Belgium	99	1930
Hamburg	Valparaíso, Chile	87	1930
Taltal, Chile	Brügge, Belgium	81	1930
Hamburg	Port Lincoln, Australia	138	1932
Port Victoria, Australia	Barry, Wales	106	1933
Hamburg	Wallaroo, Australia	66	1932–33
Hamburg	Port Victoria	65	1933–34
Port Victoria	Queenstown, Ireland	108	1934
Hamburg	Port Victoria	83	1934–35
Port Victoria	Queenstown	91	1935
Hamburg	Valparaíso	71	1938
Hamburg	Valparaíso	109	1939

== Stamps ==
Priwall was depicted on a postage stamp issued by the Falkland Islands.

== Bibliography ==
Notes

References

- Drumm, Russell (2001). The barque of saviors: Eagle's passage from the Nazi Navy to the U.S. Coast Guard (2001 ed.). Houghton Mifflin Harcourt. ISBN 0-395-98367-3. - Total pages: 250
- Carter, Robert (2004). Windjammers: The Final Story (2004 ed.). Rosenberg Publishing Pty. ISBN 1-877058-04-1. - Total pages: 254
- Parrott, Daniel S. (2004). Tall Ships Down: The Last Voyages of the Pamir, Albatross, Marques, Pride of Baltimore, and Maria Asumpta (2004 ed.). McGraw-Hill Professional. ISBN 0-07-143545-X. - Total pages: 352
