= Moshulu =

Sailing ship built in 1904

Coordinates: 39.94234°N 75.14104°W

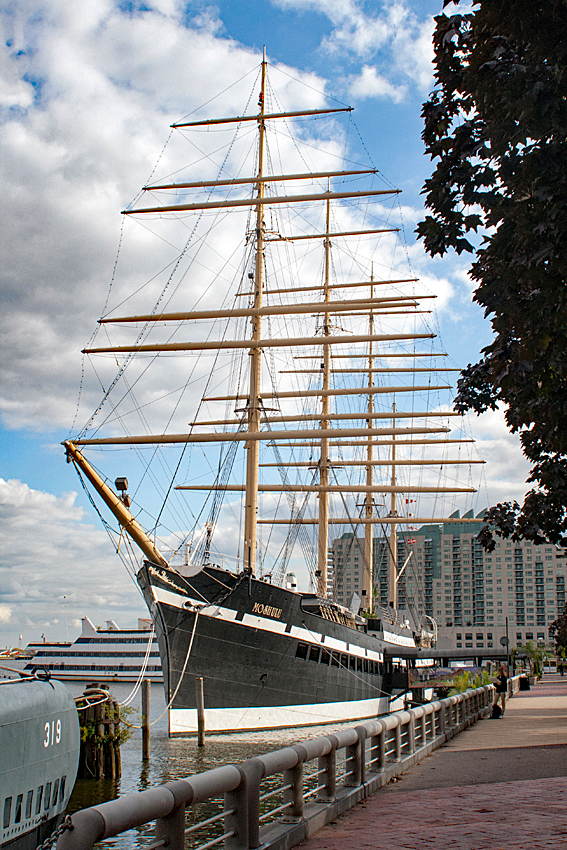
- Moshulu at Penn's Landing, Philadelphia

History

German Empire
- Name: Kurt
- Namesake: Dr. Kurt Siemers
- Owner: G. H. J. Siemers & Co., Hamburg
- Route: Europe to Chile and Newcastle, Australia
- Builder: William Hamilton & Co., Port Glasgow
- Cost: £36,000
- Laid down: 1903
- Launched: 18 April 1904
- Christened: 18 April 1904
- Completed: June 1904
- Maiden voyage: June 1904 via Santa Rosalía to Valparaíso
- Home port: Hamburg,
- Fate: Seized by the US as enemy asset

United States
- Name: Moshulu
- Route: (US) Manila, Australia, South Africa
- Acquired: 1917
- Out of service: 1928
- Home port: San Francisco
- Fate: Sold to Finland, 1935

Finland
- Name: Moshulu
- Route: Australia to Europe grain trade
- Acquired: 1935
- Decommissioned: 1970
- Out of service: 1940
- Reinstated: 1935 as a cargo ship, 1948 as a grain store
- Home port: Mariehamn, Naantali
- Fate: Capsized and demasted 1947, sold to the United States, 1970

United States
- Name: Moshulu
- Acquired: 1970
- Reinstated: 1975 as a restaurant
- Home port: Philadelphia
- Status: Museum ship/restaurant ship

General characteristics
- Class & type: four-masted steel barque; cargo ship, fl. warehouse, restaurant ship
- Displacement: 7,000 ts (1,700 ts ship + 5,300 ts cargo); Gross/Net Tons: 3,109 GRT / 2,875 NRT; Deadweight: 5,300 tons
- Length: 396 ft (121 m) (overall); 359 ft (109 m) (on deck); 335.3 ft (102.2 m) (btw. perpendiculars)
- Beam: 46.9 ft (14.3 m)
- Height: 212 ft (65 m) (keel to masthead truck); 185 ft (56 m) (main deck to masthead truck)
- Draft: 24.3 ft (7.4 m) at 5,300 tons
- Depth: 28 ft (8.5 m) (depth moulded)
- Depth of hold: 26.6 ft (8.1 m)
- Decks: 2 continuous steel decks, poop, midshipbridge and forecastle decks
- Installed power: no auxiliary propulsion; donkey engine for sail winches, steam rudder
- Propulsion: wind
- Sail plan: 4.180 m²; 34 sails: 18 square sails, 3 spankers, 13 staysails
- Speed: highest recorded: 17 knots (31 km/h)
- Boats & landing craft carried: four lifeboats
- Complement: max. 35
- Crew: 33 (captain, 1st & 2nd mate, 1 steward, 29 able seamen)

Moshulu is a four-masted steel barque, built as Kurt by William Hamilton and Company at Port Glasgow in Scotland in 1904. The largest remaining original windjammer, she is currently a floating restaurant docked in Penn's Landing, Philadelphia.

== History ==
Originally named Kurt after Kurt Siemers, director general and president of the Hamburg shipping company G. H. J. Siemers & Co., she was, along with her sistership Hans, one of the last four-masted steel barques to be built on the Clyde. Constructed for G. H. J. Siemers & Co. to be used in the nitrate trade, at a cost of £36,000, she was launched in 1904. Her first master was Captain Christian Schütt, followed by Captain Wilhelm H. G. Tönissen in 1908 who made a fast voyage from Newcastle, New South Wales, to Valparaíso with a cargo of coal in 31 days.

Between 1904 and 1914 under German ownership, Kurt shipped coal from Wales to South America, nitrate from Chile to Germany, coal from Australia to Chile, and coke and patent fuel from Germany to Santa Rosalía, Mexico.

On the outbreak of World War I in 1914, Kurt was sailed to Astoria, Oregon, under the command of Captain Tönissen, where she was laid up. When the US entered the war in 1917, she was seized. She was first renamed Dreadnought ("one who fears nothing"), then because a sailing ship of that name was already registered in the US, she was renamed the Moshulu (which had the same meaning in the Seneca language) by the First Lady of the United States and wife of President Woodrow Wilson, Edith Wilson. Between 1917 and 1920, Moshulu was owned by the U.S. Shipping Board and carried wool and chrome between North America, Manila, and Australia.

From 1920 to 1935, Moshulu was in various private hands based in San Francisco. From 1920 to 1922, she was owned by the Moshulu Navigation Co. (Charles Nelson & Co.), San Francisco; in 1922, she was sold to James Tyson of San Francisco; and in 1922, she was repurchased by Charles Nelson. The big four-masted barque ran in the timber trade along the U.S. West coast to Australia and South Africa from 1920 to 1928. After her last timber run to Melbourne and Geelong, Australia, in 1928, she was laid up in Los Angeles; later on, she was kept in places in or near Seattle, Washington: Lake Union, Winslow on (Puget Sound), and Esquimalt in British Columbia, Canada, 100 nautical miles (190 km) northwest of Seattle.

In 1935, the Moshulu was bought for $12,000 by Gustaf Erikson. On 14 March 1935, when the contract was signed, Captain Gunnar Boman took over the ship and sailed her to Port Victoria. Gustaf Erikson had her operate in the grain trade from Australia to Europe. During the period of Erikson's ownership, the working language of the ship was Swedish, even though she sailed under the Finnish flag; the ship's home port at the time, Mariehamn, is in Swedish-speaking Åland, an autonomous region of Finland.

At the end of 1938, the ship left Belfast for Port Lincoln and Port Victoria, in South Australia, under the command of Captain Mikael Sjögren and with 18-year-old Eric Newby as an apprentice seaman; Newby went on to become a travel writer and wrote about his experiences of that voyage in the book The Last Grain Race (1956). Moshulu arrived in Queenstown (Cobh, Ireland) on 10 June 1939, after 91 days at sea, winning the last race of square-rigged sailing ships between Australia and Europe.

The ship was seized by the Germans in 1940 when she returned to Kristiansand, Norway, again under the command of Captain Mikael Sjögren and with a cargo of wheat from Buenos Aires. She was derigged step-by-step in the 1940s, and after having capsized in a storm close to shore at a beach in Østervik near Narvik in 1947, she was demasted by a salvaging company to be re-erected, stabilized, and towed to Bergen in July 1948. The ship's hull was sold to Trygve Sommerfeldt of Oslo. A few months later, the ship was transferred to Sweden to be used as a grain store in Stockholm from 1948 to 1952. Then she was sold to German shipowner Heinz Schliewen, who wanted to put her back to use under the name Oplag as a merchant marine training ship carrying cargo. Schliewen already used the four-masted steel barques Pamir and Passat (both former Flying P-Liners) for that purpose, but before Moshulu was rerigged, Schliewen went into bankruptcy. In 1953, Moshulu was sold to the Swedish Farmers' State Union (Svenska Lantmännens Riksförbund) of Stockholm and again was used as a floating warehouse beginning on 16 November 1953.

In 1961, the Finnish government bought the ship for 3,200 tons of Russian rye; she was towed to Naantali, a town near Turku, and she continued to be used as a grain warehouse.

In 1970, the ship was bought by the Specialty Restaurants Corporation, which rigged her out at Scheveningen in the Netherlands with replica masts, yards, and lines and towed her to South Street Seaport Museum, New York. The United States Coast Guard 3rd District Band rode on the Moshulu as she was towed from Brooklyn to the museum and played for the arrival ceremony on the Manhattan side of the river. She was later towed to the Penn's Landing waterfront in Center City, Philadelphia, where she is adjacent to the museum ships USS Olympia and USS Becuna in Independence Seaport Museum. Other sources have it that the Walt Disney Company bought the ship but soon transferred her to the Specialty Restaurants Corporation. Since 2003, she is operated by SCC Restaurants LLC.

== In popular culture ==
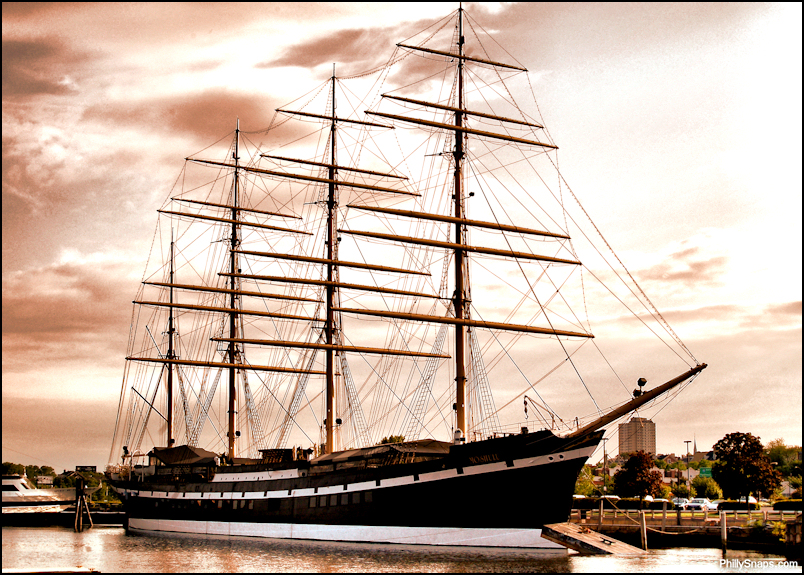
The four-masted barque Moshulu

Moshulu was made famous by the books of Eric Newby. At the age of 18, he was apprenticed aboard the Moshulu, joining the ship in Belfast in 1938 and sailing to Port Lincoln in Australia with a load of ballast stone in 82 days, a good passage for a windjammer. Moshulu took 4,875 tons of bagged grain on board in Port Victoria and began her return voyage to Ireland in the spring of 1939. She reached her destination in 91 days, a faster passage than that of any of the other sailing ships making similar passages that year.

During the voyage, Newby took part in all the work required to maintain the ship, such as constant chipping of rust, painting and polishing brass and copper, and overhauling the standing and running rigging – all of this on top of the day-to-day tasks required to sail the ship, such as changing from fair-weather sails to storm sails and back again as storms rose and abated.

The crew at the time was predominantly Finnish and Swedish, and nationality was a source of friction amongst them throughout the voyage.

The journey was documented in Newby's books The Last Grain Race (1956) and Learning the Ropes: An Apprentice in the Last of the Windjammers (1999). The title of the former book refers to the last grain race before the outbreak of World War II. The latter contains more than 150 of the photographs Newby took while aboard.

In the 1974 American film, The Godfather Part II, the ship plays the role of the vessel that brought the boy Vito Andolini across the Atlantic from Sicily to New York City in 1901.

In the training montage sequence of the blockbuster 1976 film Rocky, Rocky Balboa, played by Sylvester Stallone, can be seen running past Moshulu while training for his heavyweight championship bout against Apollo Creed.

== See also ==
- List of large sailing vessels
