= Parma (barque) =

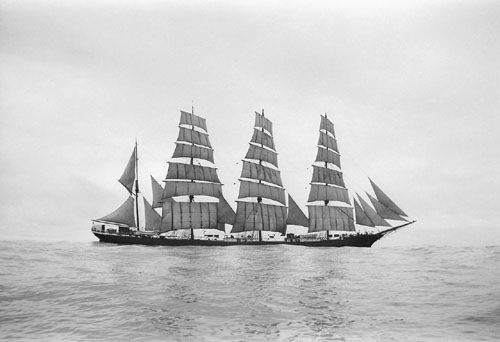
- Parma in 1932

History
- Name: Arrow (1902-12); Parma (1912-38)
- Owner: Anglo American Oil Co Ltd, London (1902-12); F. Laeisz, Hamburg (1912-20); British Government (1920-21); Belgian Government (1921); F. Laeisz, Hamburg (1921-31); De Cloux & Villiers, Mariehamn (1931-36); Rederei A/B Parma U V Wennstrom, Mariehamn (1936-37); Barnett Bros, London (1937-38)
- Operator: Anglo American Oil Co Ltd, London (1902-12); F. Laeisz, Hamburg (1912-20); British Government (1920-21); Association Maritime Belge (1921); F. Laeisz, Hamburg (1921-31); De Cloux & Villiers, Mariehamn (1931-36); Rederei A/B Parma U V Wennstrom, Mariehamn (1936-37); Barnett Bros, London (1937-38)
- Port of registry: (United Kingdom) London (1902-12); (German Empire) Hamburg (1912-19); (Weimar Republic) Hamburg (1919-20); (United Kingdom) London (1920-21); (Belgium) Antwerp (1921); (Weimar Republic) Hamburg (1921-31); (Finland) Mariehamn (1931-37); (United Kingdom) London (1937-38)
- Builder: A Rodger & Co, Port Glasgow
- Yard number: 361
- Launched: April 1902
- Completed: April 1902
- In service: 1902
- Out of service: Hulked 1936
- Identification: Code Letters RBWN (1912-20, 21-31); Code letters OHQQ (1931-36); United Kingdom Official Number 115804 (1902-12, 20-21, 36-38); Finnish Official Number 324 (1931-36)
- Fate: Scrapped 1938

General characteristics
- Tonnage: 3,084 GRT; 2,882 NRT; 5,300 DWT
- Length: 327 ft 7 in (99.85 m)
- Beam: 46 ft 5 in (14.15 m)
- Draught: 28 ft (8.53 m)
- Depth: 26 ft 2 in (7.98 m)
- Propulsion: sail
- Sail plan: Barque

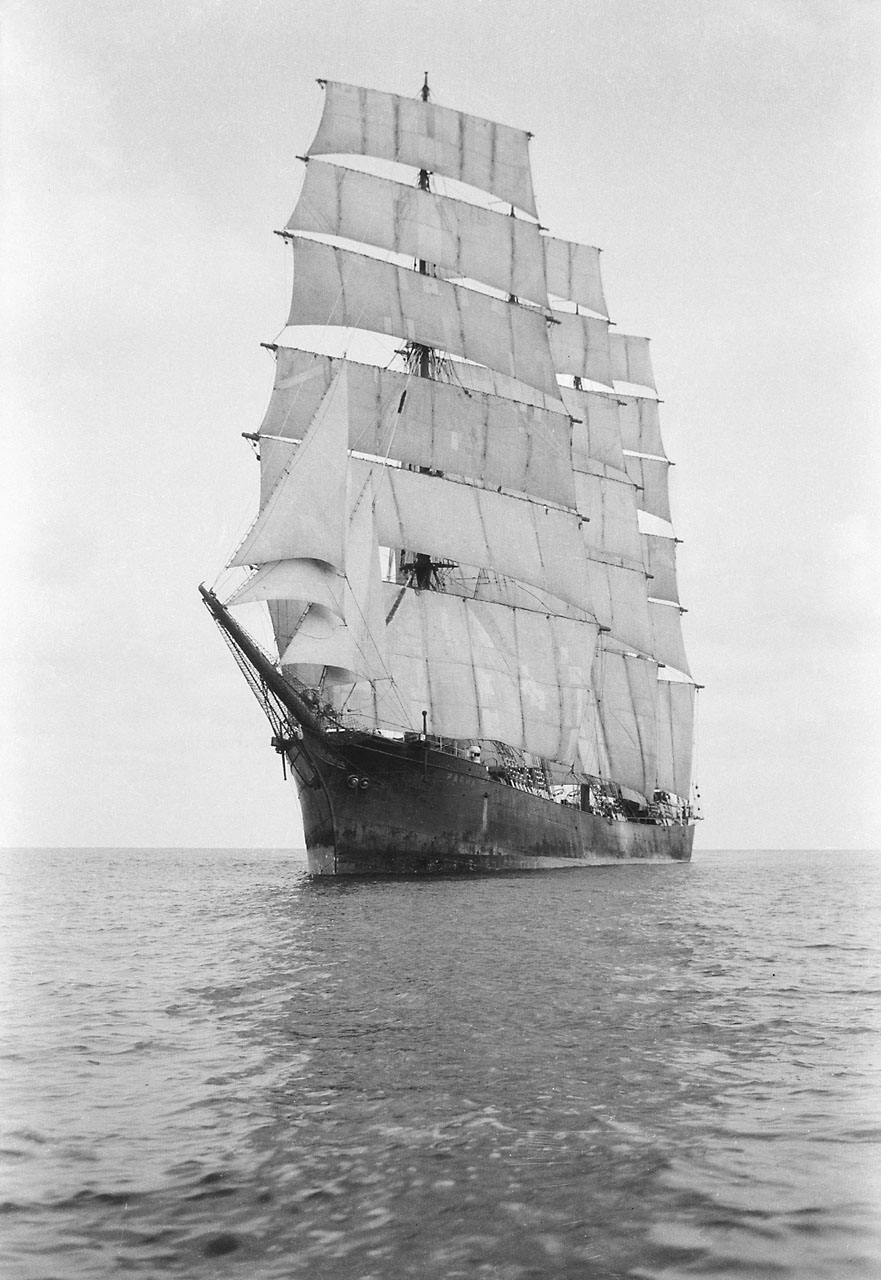
Parma becalmed in 1932 or '33

Parma was a four-masted steel-hulled barque which was built in 1902 as Arrow for the Anglo-American Oil Co Ltd, London. In 1912 she was sold to F. Laeisz, Hamburg, Germany. During the First World War she was interned in Chile, and postwar was assigned to the United Kingdom as war reparations. She was sold back to Laiesz in 1921. She was sold in 1931 to Ruben De Cloux & Alan Villiers of Mariehamn, Finland. Following an accident in 1936, she was sold and hulked at Haifa, British Mandate of Palestine, now Israel, for two years before being scrapped.

== Description ==
Arrow was built by A Rodger & Co, Port Glasgow as yard number 361. She was 327 feet 7 inches (99.85 m) long, with a beam of 46 feet 5 inches (14.15 m) and a depth of 26 feet 2 inches (7.98 m). She had four masts and was rigged as a barque, with royal sails over double top and topgallant sails. Arrow was completed in April 1902. She was a sister ship to Eclipse, which was completed two months later.

== History ==
Arrow entered service with the Anglo-American Oil Co Ltd, London, employed in the kerosene trade. In 1912, she was sold to F Laeisz, Hamburg for £15,000 and was renamed Parma. She was employed in the nitrate trade between Germany and Chile. At the outbreak of the First World War, Parma was interned at Iquique, Chile. In 1920, she was assigned to the United Kingdom as war reparations. In 1921, she was transferred to the Belgian Government, and placed under the management of Association Maritime Belge, Antwerp. On 8 November 1921, Parma was sold back to F Laeisz for £10,000 stg. She was again employed in the nitrate trade. In 1926, Parma sailed from Hamburg to Talcahuano, Chile in 86 days and in 1928 she sailed from Land's End to Talcahuano in 70 days.

In 1931, Parma was sold to Ruben De Cloux and Alan Villiers of Mariehamn, Finland for 34,000 ℛ︁ℳ︁. She was the largest sailing ship under the Finnish flag at the time, holding that position until 1935 when Gustaf Erikson bought Moshulu. She was employed in the wheat trade between Germany and Australia. In 1933, she sailed from Port Victoria to Falmouth in 83 days. This was the fastest ever achieved by a sailing ship.

On 1 July 1936, Parma collided with an observation tower at Princes Dock, Glasgow when a gust of wind caught her as she was docking. As a result of the collision, plates in her hull were sprung open by falling coping stones from the quayside. Parma was sold to Rederei A/B Parma U V Wennstrom, Mariehamn. She was stripped of her masts and rigging, and converted to a hulk. In 1936, Parma was sold to Barnett Bros, London. Parma served as a hulk at Haifa, Palestine (now Israel), until 1938 when she was scrapped. A model of Parma can be seen at the Ålands Sjöfartsmuseum, Mariehamn.

== Captains ==
The captains of Parma were:-

- Töpper (1924–26)
- Holst (1926–27)
- Rohwer (1928–29)
- Brockhöft (1928–29)
- Ruben de Cloux (1931–36)

== Official Numbers and Code Letters ==
Official Numbers were a forerunner to IMO numbers. Parma was assigned the United Kingdom Official Number 115804, she was also assigned the Finnish Official Number 324.

Parma was assigned the Code Letters RBWN when she was under the German Flag, and OHQQ when she was under the Finnish Flag.
