= Gustaf Erikson =

Finnish ship owner (1872–1947)

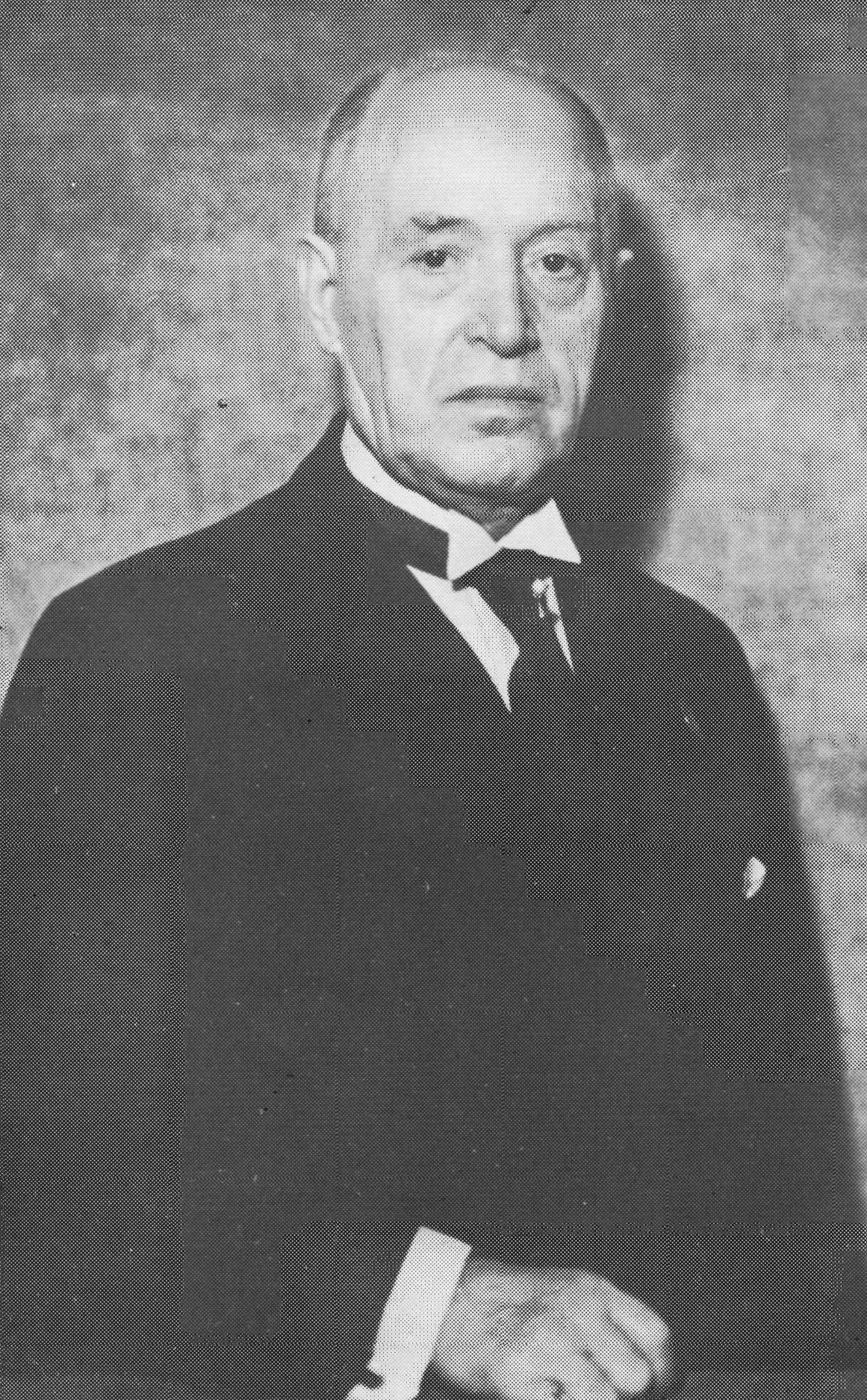
Gustaf Erikson

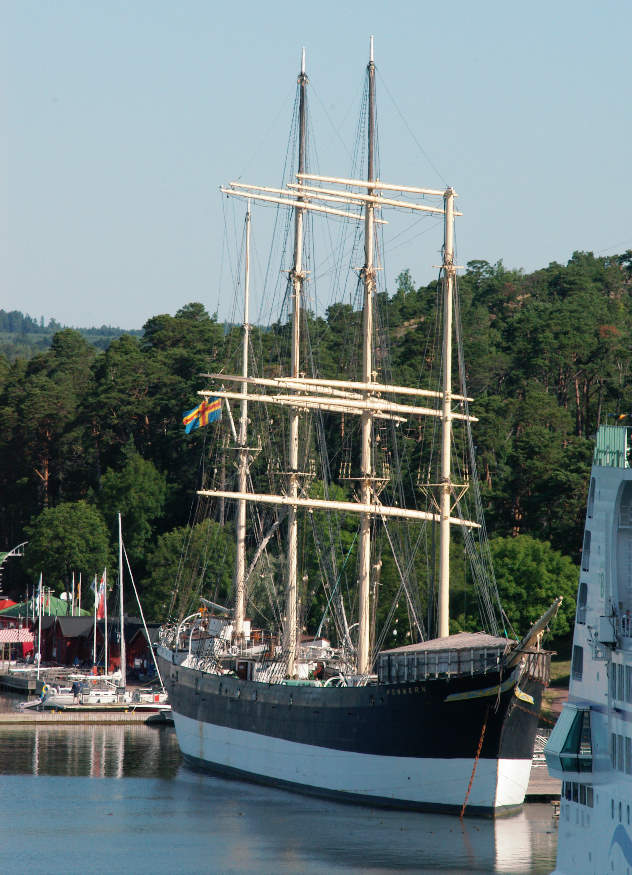
Pommern in Mariehamn 2005

Gustaf Adolf Mauritz Erikson (1872 in Lemland – 1947 in Mariehamn) was a ship owner from the Åland islands. He was famous for the fleet of windjammers he operated to the end of his life, mainly on the grain trade from Australia to Europe.

Erikson was involved in sailing for virtually his entire life. He went to sea at age 9, was commanding a sailing vessel in the North Sea trade by age 19, and was master of a number of square-rigged vessels before becoming an owner.

His ships were bought cheaply, as most shipping companies switched to steam ships about the turn of the century; Erikson would often acquire ships at shipbreakers' prices. In the early 1920s, some competition still remained for the windjammers sold – the shipping company F. Laeisz even ordered new sailing ships in the 1920s – but in the 1930s, Erikson owned a significant share of the operational windjammers of the world. In March 1935, he purchased Moshulu, "one of the finest steel barques afloat", for only $12,000.

By the late 1930s, the South Australian grain trade was virtually the only profitable use for windjammers, and then only if the ship owner minimized costs as much as possible. Erikson supplied his ships adequately with crew and supplies, as these were necessary for his ships to sail quickly and efficiently, but supplied neither more crew nor equipment than was necessary. Erikson's large four-masted barques would routinely sail on voyages of 30,000 nautical miles (56,000 km) with less than 30 crew.

In 1935, 19-year old Richard Brinsley Sheridan published his book Heavenly Hell: The Experiences of an Apprentice in a Four-Mast Barque, describing his 10 months on Erikson’s barque Lawhill.

A young Eric Newby sailed to Australia on Moshulu in 1938–1939 as part of the South Australian grain trade. At the time, she was owned by Erikson and part of the last "great fleet of sailing ships". Newby chronicled his trip in The Last Grain Race and Learning the Ropes, where he wrote that Erikson was both respected and reviled by the crew, who knew him only as "Ploddy Gustav". Of the 13 ships that took part in the 1939 grain race, 10 were Erikson ships.

== Ships ==
- Tjerimai (1913–1925, three-masted composite (wood on iron frames) barque, 1 550 t, built 1883 in Amsterdam. Sank in the North Sea in a collision with a Dutch trawler, the captain died)
- Åland (1913–1914, ex Renée Rickmers, four-masted iron barque, 3 300 t, built 1887 in Glasgow. Ran aground on a coral reef off New Caledonia as lighthouses were unlit, wrecked, crew saved)
- Fredenborg (1914–1916, three-masted wooden barque, built 1881 in Geta, Åland, about 700 t. Sold, wrecked same year)
- Borrowdale (1916–1917, three-masted iron barque, 1 850 t, built 1868 in Liverpool. Torpedoed by Germans by the mouth of the Bristol channel, crew saved)

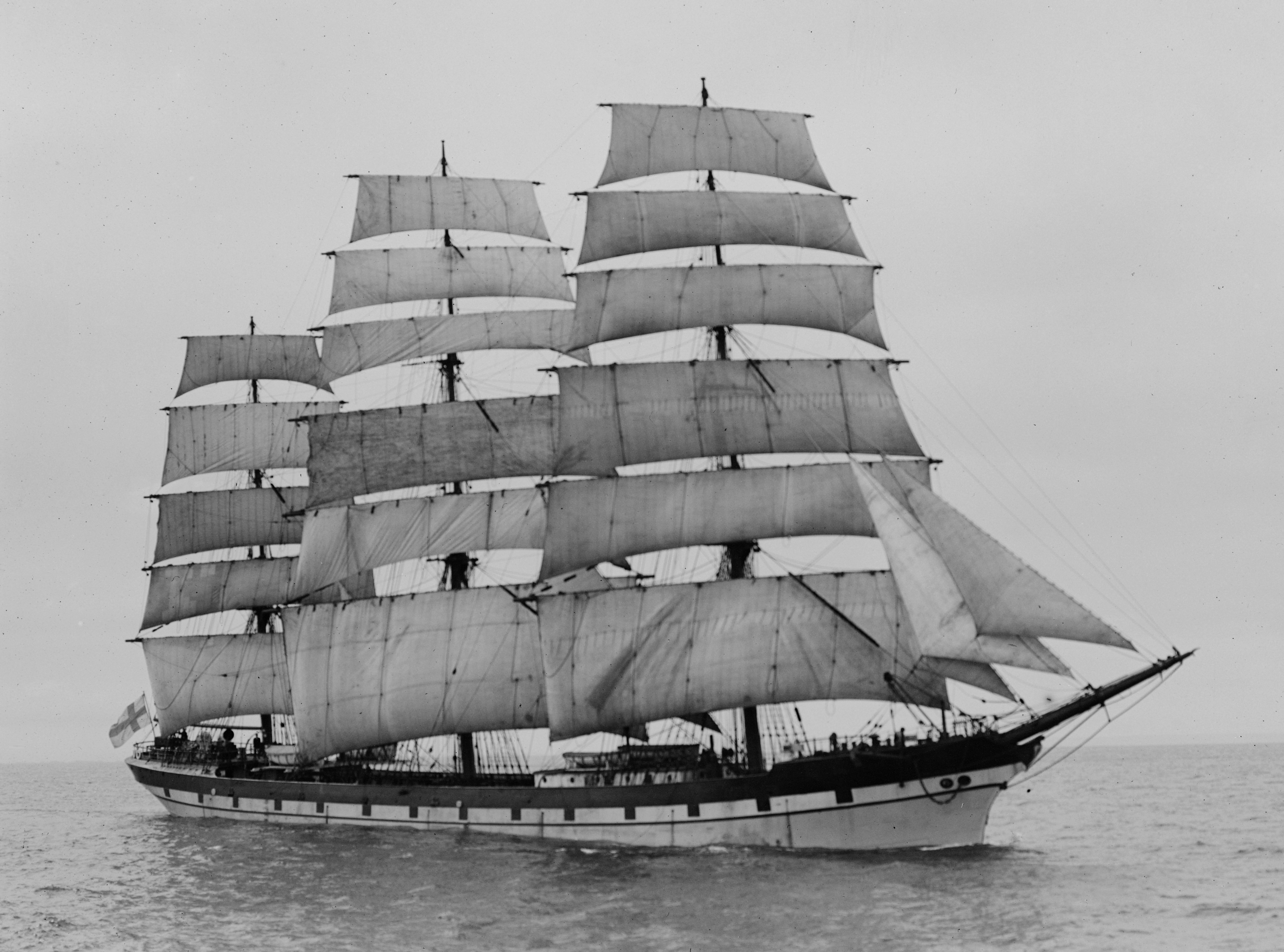
Grace Harwar

- Grace Harwar (1916–1935, three-masted full-rigged steel ship, 2 950 t, built 1889 in Glasgow. Sold to be scrapped)
- Professor Koch (1916–1923, three-masted steel barque, 2 350 t, built 1891 in Glasgow. Collided with an iceberg, continued to Montevideo, was deemed wrecked)
- Ingrid (1917–1919, wooden barquentine, 650 t, built 1907 in Geta. Took refuge in Falmouth, deemed as wrecked. The English repaired the ship, mounted an auxiliary engine and sailed it in West India among other places, scrapped 1939)
- Southern Belle (1917–1919, three-masted wooden barque, about 850 tons, built 1871 in Nova Scotia. Sold)
- Margareta (1917, four-masted steel barque, 3 100 t, built 1889 in Glasgow. Torpedoed in the Irish Sea, crew saved)
- Lawhill (1917–1942, four-masted steel barque, 4 600 t, built 1892 in Dundee. Taken as war prize by South Africa)
- Woodburn (1919–1924, three-masted steel barque, 2 600 t, built 1896 in Glasgow. Sold to Fiji to be a coal barge)
- Rigel (1919–1920, steamship, 500 t, built 1918 at Hietalahti Shipyard and Engineering Works, Helsinki. Sold.)
- Edgar (1920–1922, steamship, 1250 t, built at Hietalahti Shipyard and Engineering Works. Sold to Germany.)

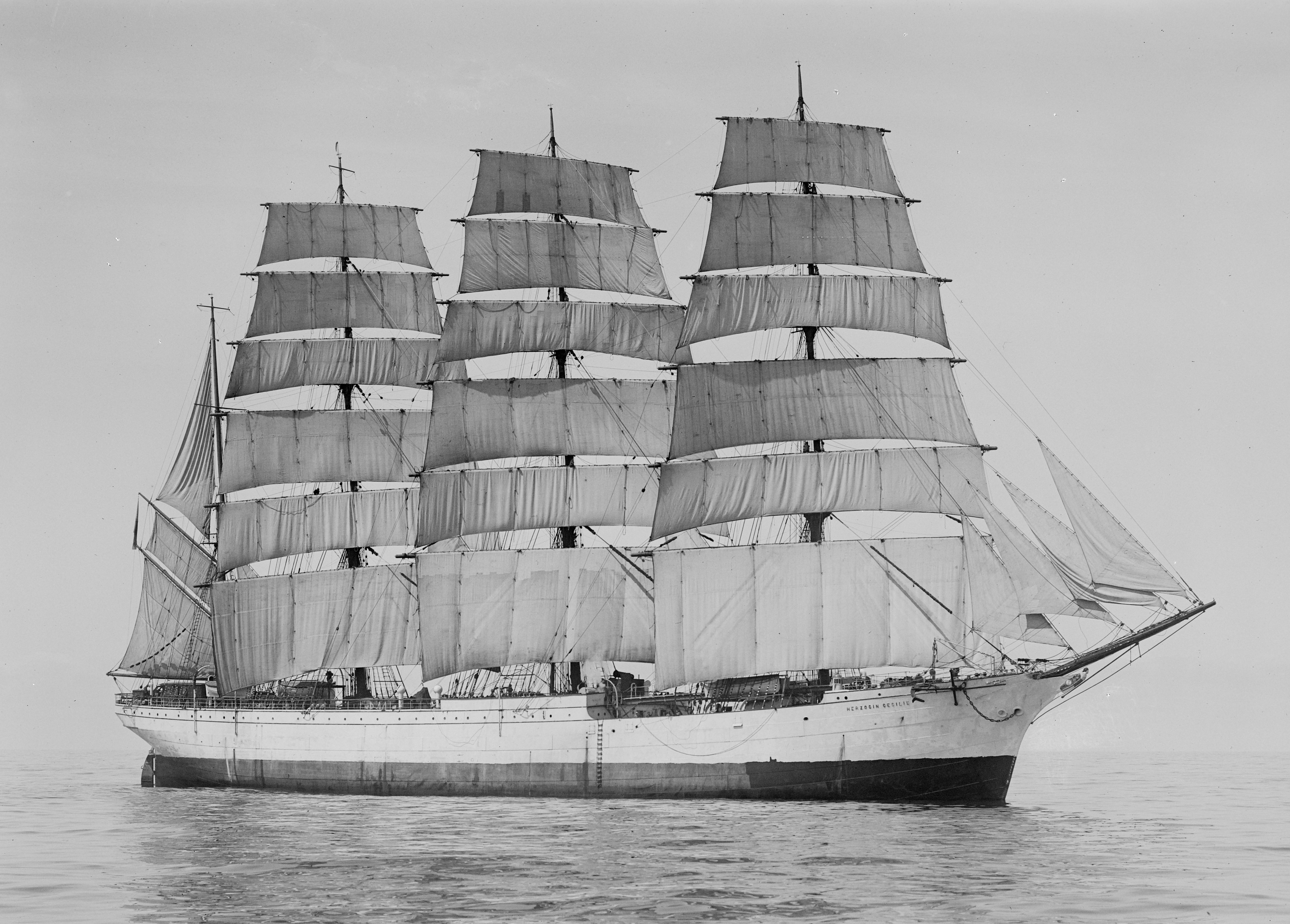
Herzogin Cecilie

- Herzogin Cecilie (1921–1936, four-masted steel barque, built 1902 in Bremerhaven. Ran aground in the English Channel, off Devon, wrecked)
- Loch Linnhe (1922–1933, three-masted iron barque, 2 200 t, built 1876 in Glasgow. Ran aground in the Kökar archipelago in 1933, wrecked)
- Pommern (1923–1953, ex Mneme, four-masted steel barque, 4 050 t, built 1903 in Glasgow. In Mariehamn when the war broke out 1939 and did not sail any more, given to the city of Mariehamn as museum ship)
- Carradale (1923–1924, four-masted steel barque, 3 300 t, built 1889 in Glasgow. Sold to be scrapped)
- Penang (1923–1940, formerly Albert Rickmers, three-masted steel barque, 3 250 t, built 1905 in Bremerhaven. Torpedoed in the Atlantic, all 18 men lost)
- Archibald Russell (1924–1948, four-masted steel barque, 3 950 t, built 1905 in Greenock, Scotland. In Hull when World War II broke out, seized 1941, returned to the shipowner 1948, sold to be scrapped)
- Killoran (1924–1940, three-masted steel barque, 3 050 t, built 1900 in Troon, Scotland. Sunk by German auxiliary cruiser Widder off the Canary Islands, crew released 1941)
- Olivebank (1924–1939, four-masted steel barque, 4 400 t, built 1892 in Glasgow. Ran on a mine in the North Sea 8.9.1939, 14 men drowned)
- Carmen (1924–1934, three-masted wooden barque, 850 t, built 1921 in Granboda, Åland. Abandoned near Bornholm 2.9.1934, left to the rescuers)
- Polstjernan (1924, four-masted wooden schooner, 1600 t, built 1920 in Dragsfjärd, Finland. Sold 7.3.1924 to Koivisto [ Primorsk?])
- Baltic (1924–1939, four-masted wooden barquentine, 750 t, built 1919 in Lemland, Åland. Sold to Rauma [or to Uusikaupunki?]).
- Hougomont (1925–1932, four-masted steel barque, 4 000 t, built 1897 in Greenock in England. Unrigged in a tornado off Australia, became a breakwater in Investigator Strait in South Australia)
- Lingard (1925–1935, three-masted steel barque, 1600 t, built 1893 in Arendal in Norway. Collided with the Swedish s/s Gerda 1.11.1935, towed to Gothenburg, sold to the sailing ships' club of Norway. The crew of 21 of Gerda drowned in the accident)
- Ostrobotnia (1925–1934, three-masted wooden schooner, 800 t, built 1919 in Jakobstad. Scrapped at the Uusikaupunki yard)
- Winterhude (1925–1944, formerly Mabel Rickmers, three-masted steel barque, 3 250 t, built 1898 in Bremerhaven. Arrived 30.9. 1939 in Stavanger, was unrigged, rent as warehouse, sold to the German marine 27.4.1944, become a barge in Hamburg)
- Lalla Rookh (built 1876, renamed Karhu and later Effendi, renamed back to Lalla Rookh 1926–1928, three-masted iron barque, 1450 t, built 1876 in Liverpool. Sold to Belgium to be scrapped 27.11.1928)
- Estonia (1927–1936, three-masted wooden barquentine, 800 t, built 1921 in Gutmannsbach. Wrecked 5.10. at Örskär)
- Melbourne (1929–1932, ex Gustav, ex Australia, four-masted steel barque, 4 250 t, built 1892 in Glasgow. M/t Seminole collided with Melbourne outside Queenstown 30.6.1932, 11 men drowned when the ship sank)
- Madara (1929–1939, wooden motor ship, 900 t, built 1919 in Ärveskjöbing. Sold in Bremen after a collision)

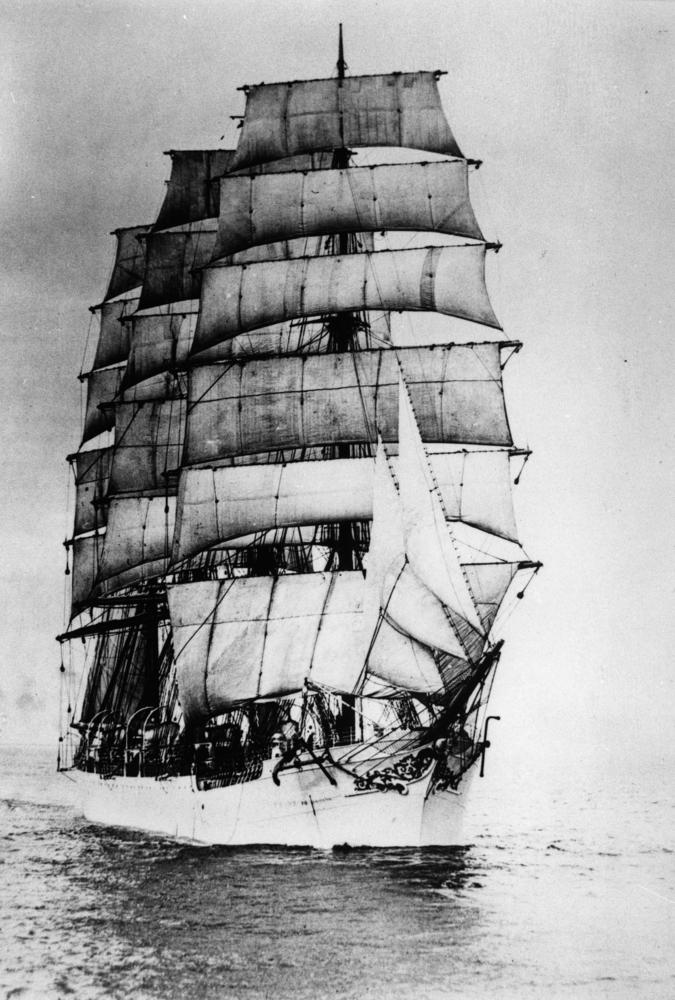
Viking

- Viking (1929–1951, four-masted steel barque, 4 000 t, built 1907 in Copenhagen. In Mariehamn during the war, sailed afterwards, sold to Sweden, now restaurant and hotel in Gothenburg.)
- Ponape (1929–1936 ex Bellhouse), ex Regina Elena, four-masted steel barque, 3 500 t, built 1903 in Genoa. sold to be scrapped
- Pamir (1931–1941 and 1948–1950, four-masted steel barque, 4 500 t, built 1905 in Hamburg. Seized in New Zealand 7.8.1941 as war prize, given back 1948, last grain journey in 1949, sold to be scrapped 1950, bought by Germans, capsized in the Atlantic Ocean 1957, 80 crew lost, 6 saved)
- L'Avenir (1932–1937 L'Avenir), four-masted steel barque, 3 650 t, built 1908 in Bremerhaven. Sold to the German government 1937, renamed Admiral Karpfanger, disappeared 1938 on way from Australia to Europe
- Passat (1932–1950, four-masted steel barque, 4 700 t, built 1911 in Hamburg. In Mariehamn during World War II, sailed 1946–1950, sold to be scrapped, bought by Germans, museum ship in Travemünde)
- Sweden (1932–1947, wooden motor ship, 600 t, built 1921 in Sweden. Sold to Helsinki)
- Odine (1933, four-masted wooden motor ship. Bought for the motors, hull scrapped. Wreck lies in the Uusikaupunki archipelago)
- Vera (1933–1947, wooden motor ship, 650 t, built 1936 [?] in Sweden. Sold)
- Warma (1933–1937, three-masted wooden barque, 1 400 t, built 1922 in Uusikaupunki. Sold to Germany)
- Eläköön (1933–1943, three-masted wooden barque, 1400 t, built 1920 in Uusikaupunki. Sold to Helsinki, converted to motor barge)
- Wellamo (1933–1939, wooden barquentine, later motorized, 550 t, built 1919 in Uusikaupunki. Sold to Uusikaupunki)
- Valborg (1933–1939, four-masted wooden motored sailing ship, originally without engine, 1 500 t, built 1919 in Victoria, Canada. Destroyed in a fire)
- Kylemore (1934–1937, three-masted steel barque, 1 900 t, built 1880 in Glasgow. Sold to Germany to be scrapped)
- Pestalozzi (1934–1937, three-masted iron barque, 1 000 t, built 1884 in Hamburg. Sold to Libau to be scrapped)
- Regina (1934–1935, wooden motored sailing ship, 1 000 t, built 1919 in Porvoo. Destroyed in a fire in the Baltic Sea)
- Dione (1934–1939, four-masted wooden barquentine, 1000 t, built 1923 in Åland. Collision with unknown steamer in the Baltic Sea, towed to Uusikaupunki, unregistered 1940)

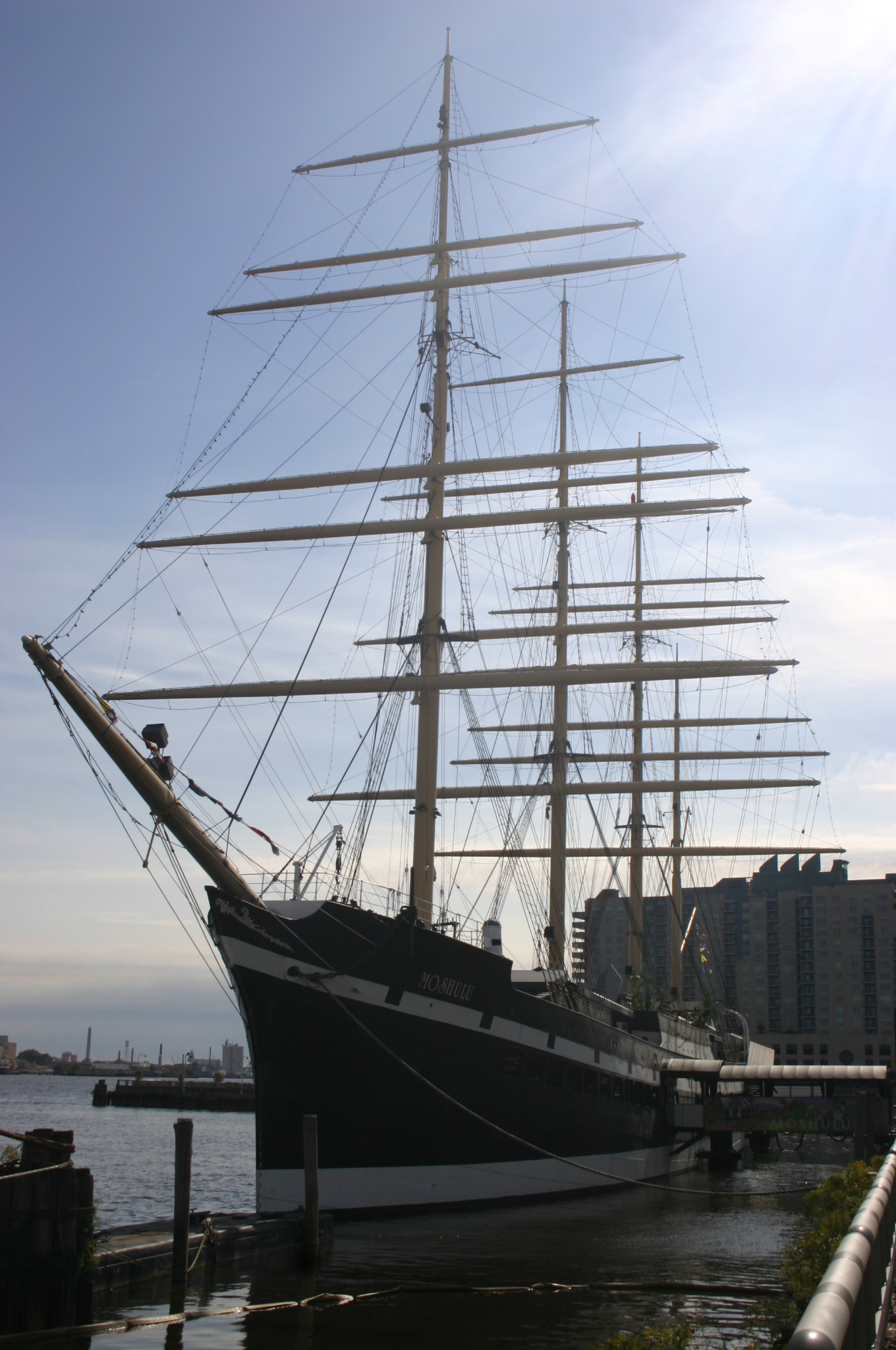
Moshulu in Philadelphia

- Moshulu (1935–1947, ex Dreadnaught, ex Kurt, four-masted steel barque, 4 900 t, built 1904 in Glasgow. Now a restaurant in Philadelphia)
- Kirsta (1937–1959 ex Glenisla), steamship, 2 500 t, built 1906 in Rostock
- Gottfried (1937–1953, steamship, 2 500 t, built 1899 in Sunderland)
- Argo (1937–1942 Argo), ex Odessa, steamship, 4 320 t, built 1898 in Glasgow. Torpedoed in the Baltic Sea 16.6.1942, 9 men drowned, among them the son of Gustaf Erikson, Gustaf Adolf
- Alca (1937–1947 ex Skåne), composite motor ship, 650 t, built 1919 in Sweden. Sold
- Agnes (1938–1942, ex Blairlogie, steamship, 5 200 t, built 1912 in Rotterdam. Torpedoed in the Baltic Sea 1.11.1942, four man drowned)
- Olivia (1940–1956, ex Kemi, steamship, 3 250 t, built 1900 in Rostock)
- Bonden (1940–1942, steamship, 900 t, built 1891 in Copenhagen, torpedoed 12.9.1942 in the Sea of Åland, crew saved)
- Avenir (1941–1950, ex Wiima, steamship, 5 080 t, built 1897 in West Hartlepool. Bought from Antti Wihuri)
- Sirius (1942–1946, ent. Bjerkvik, three-masted wooden motor schooner, sailed by the coast of Norway during the war, sold to Norway)
- Styrsö (1942–1959, ex Hilde, motor ship, 600 t, built 1894 in Sunderland, rebuilt 1944 in Uusikaupunki)
- Alden (1943–1958, ex Wisa, steamship, 6 300 t, built 1907 in Sunderland. Bought from Antti Wihuri)
- Adolf (1943–1946, steamship, 110 t, built 1889 in Varkaus. Sold to Helsinki)
- Maria (1943–1953, ex Björneborg, steamship, 3 700 t, built 1894 in England)
- Korsö (1944–1947, ex Aura, steamship, 3 250 t, built 1908 in West Hartlepool. Bought from a Finnish shipowner, given to the Soviet Union as German property.)
- Skogsö (1947–1953, ex Mars, steamship, 1040 t, built 1909 in Hoboken.)
- Granö (1947–1959, ex Stanja, steamship, 3 015 t, built 1915 in Oslo.)
- Kungsö (1947–1971, steamship, built 1947 in Turku, the year when Erikson died. Sold 1971 to Greece.)

Gustaf Erikson also owned parts in the following ships:

- Mathilda (1891–1900, three-masted barque.)
- Gessner (1892–1899, three-masted barque, built 1854)
- Adéle (1893–1898, three-masted barquentine, built 1878)
- Ocean (1894–1911, three-masted barque, built 1873)
- Montrosa (1898–1928, three-masted barque, built 1863)
- Europa (1899–1906, three-masted barque, built 1870)
- Duguay (1899–1910, three-masted barque, built 1873)
- Vanadis (1899–1903, full-rigged ship, built 1880)
- Wolfe (1902–1913, three-masted barque, built 1881i)
- Cuba (1900–1901, three-masted barque, built 1872)
- Ceres (1901–1911, three-masted barquentine, built 1871)
- Augusta (1901–1911, three-masted barque)
- Alma (1901–1902, three-masted barquentine)
- Karolina (1901–1905, brig, built 1874)
- Hilda (1901–1902, three-masted barque, built 1865)
- Kaleva (1901–1903, three-masted barque, built 1861)
- Albania (1903–1908, full-rigged ship, built 1884)
- Deo Gloria (1903–1912, three-masted barquentine, built 1861)
- Rakkaus (1903, brig, built 1874)
- Roxane (1903–1907, three-masted barque, built 1860)
- Ida (1902–1906, three-masted barquentine)
- Holmestrand (1902–1903, three-masted barque, built 1872)
- Isabel (1905–1915, Browne, three-masted barque, built 1885)
- Christine (1909–1915, three-masted barque)
- Pera (1910–1917, full-rigged ship, built 1890)
- Frieda (1913–1916, ex County of Edinburgh, four-masted barque, built 1885)
- Asia (1915–1916, three-masted barque, built 1864)
- Prompt (1916–1936, three-masted barque, built 1887)
- Concordia (1916–1918, three-masted barque)
- Lucipara (1916–1917, four-masted barque, built 1885)
- (1892 (1916 Norden)), three-masted barque
- Parchim (1916–1926, three-masted barque, built 1889)
- Neptun (1917–1928, three-masted barquentine, built 1890)
- Näsborg (1919–1930, ketch, built 1920)
- Esperanza (1920–1927, three-masted schooner, built 1919)
- Fred (1920–1934, three-masted barque, built 1920)
- Linden (1920–1937, three-masted schooner, built 1920)
- Balder (1923–1929, three-masted schooner, built 1922)
- Hildur (1926–1933, three-masted schooner)
- Vesta (1926–1935, aux. three-masted schooner)
- Vidar (1926-19??), aux. three-masted schooner
- Vineta (1926–1929, three-masted barquentine, built 1920)
- Gustaf (1929–1942, ex Elissa, aux. three-masted schooner, built 1877)
- Thekla (1929, three-masted barque, built 1881)
- Jenolin (1930–1936, aux. three-masted schooner, built 1919)
- Mozart (1931–1935, four-masted barquentine, built 1903)
- Åland (1931–1936, ex Parma ex Arrow, four-masted barque, built 1902)
- Johannes (1933–1937, aux. three-masted schooner, built 1902)
