= Pamir (ship) =

German sailing ship

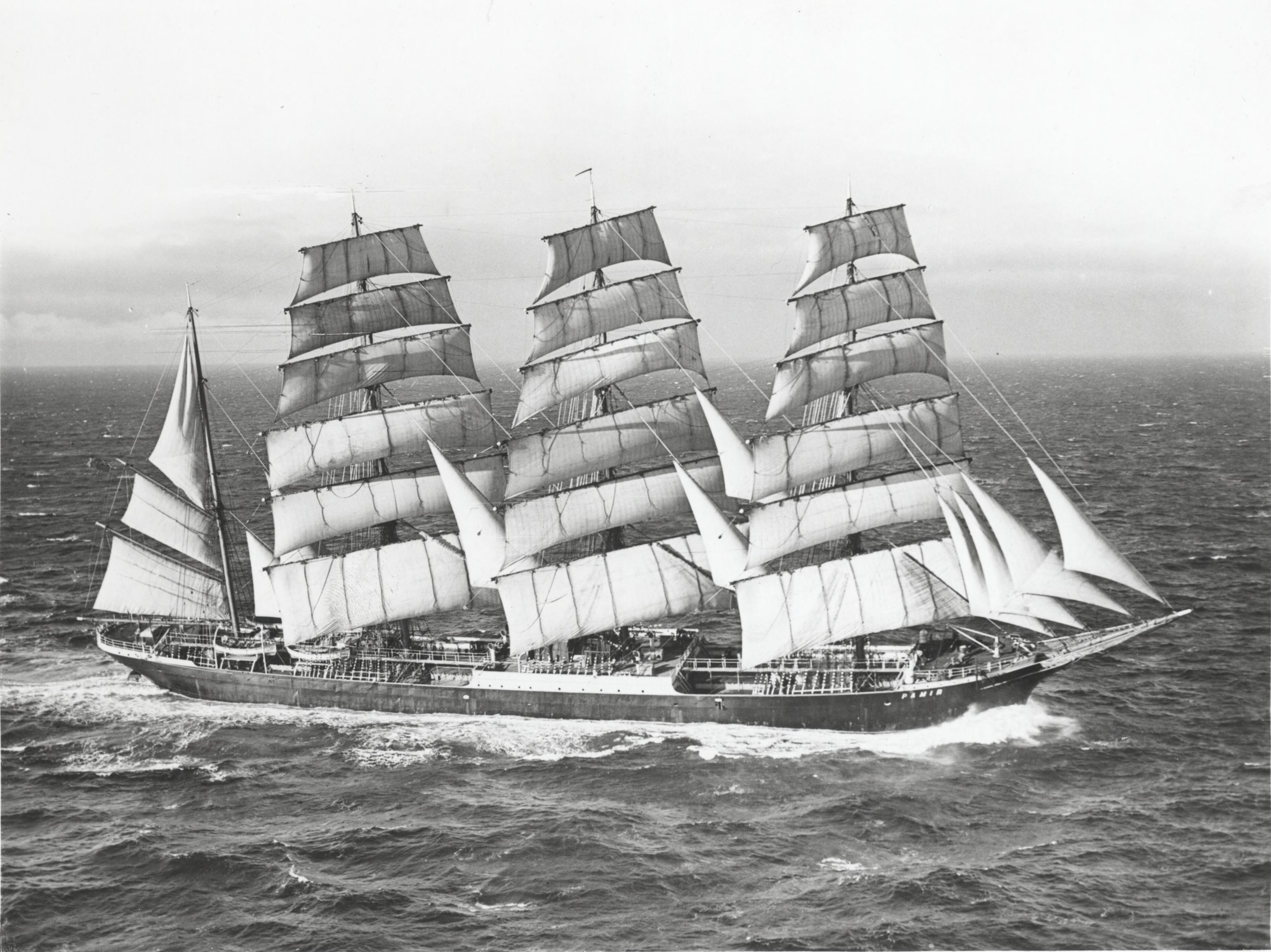
- Pamir c. 1949.

History

Germany
- Name: Pamir
- Namesake: Pamir Mountains
- Builder: Blohm & Voss, Hamburg
- Launched: 29 July 1905

Italy
- Acquired: 1920, as war reparations

Germany
- Acquired: F. Laeisz Company, 1924

Finland
- Acquired: Erikson Line, 1931

New Zealand
- Acquired: Seized as prize of war, 3 August 1941

Finland
- Acquired: Erikson Line, 1948

West Germany
- Owner: Heinz Schliewen
- Acquired: 1951

West Germany
- Owner: Stiftung Pamir und Passat
- Acquired: 1954
- Fate: Sunk 1957

General characteristics
- Class & type: Steel hulled barque
- Tons burthen: 3910 bm
- Length: 114.5 m (375 ft) LOA
- Beam: 14 m (46 ft)
- Draft: 7.25 m (23.5 ft)
- Propulsion: Top speed 16 knots (30 km/h); cruise speed 8-9 knots.
- Sail plan: Four-masted barque, 3,800 m² (40,900 ft²) of sails

Pamir was a four-masted barque built for the German shipping company F. Laeisz. One of their famous Flying P-Liners, named after the Pamir Mountains, she was the last commercial sailing ship to round Cape Horn, in 1949. By 1957, she had been outmoded by modern bulk carriers and could not operate at a profit. Her shipping consortium's inability to finance much-needed repairs or to recruit sufficient sail-trained officers caused severe technical difficulties. On 21 September 1957, she was caught in Hurricane Carrie and sank off the Azores, with only six survivors rescued after an extensive search.

== History ==
=== Early days and World War I ===
She was built at the Blohm & Voss shipyards in Hamburg, launched on 29 July 1905. She had a steel hull and tonnage of 3,020 GRT (2,777 net). She had an overall length of 114.5 m (375 ft), a beam of about 14 m (46 ft) and a draught of 7.25 m (23.5 ft). Three masts stood 51.2 m (168 ft) above deck and the main yard was 28 m (92 ft) wide. She carried 3,800 m^{2} (40,900 ft^{2}) of sails and could reach a top speed of 16 knots (30 km/h). Her regular cruise speed was around 8-9 knots.

She was the fifth of ten near-sister ships. She was commissioned on 18 October 1905 and used by the Laeisz company in the South American nitrate trade. By 1914, she had made eight voyages to Chile, taking between 64 and about 70 days for a one-way trip from Hamburg to Valparaíso or Iquique, the foremost Chilean nitrate ports at the time. From October 1914, she stayed in Santa Cruz de la Palma port in La Palma Island, Canary Islands. Due to post war conditions, she did not return from Santa Cruz de la Palma to Hamburg until 17 March 1920.

In the same year, she was handed over to Italy as war reparation. On 15 July 1920, she left Hamburg via Rotterdam to Naples towed by tugs. The Italian government was unable to find a deep-water sailing ship crew, so she was laid up near Castellamare in the Gulf of Naples.

In 1924, the F. Laeisz Company bought her back for £7,000 and put her into service in the nitrate trade again. Laeisz sold her in 1931 to the Finnish shipping company of Gustaf Erikson, which used her in the Australian wheat trade.

=== World War II and beyond ===
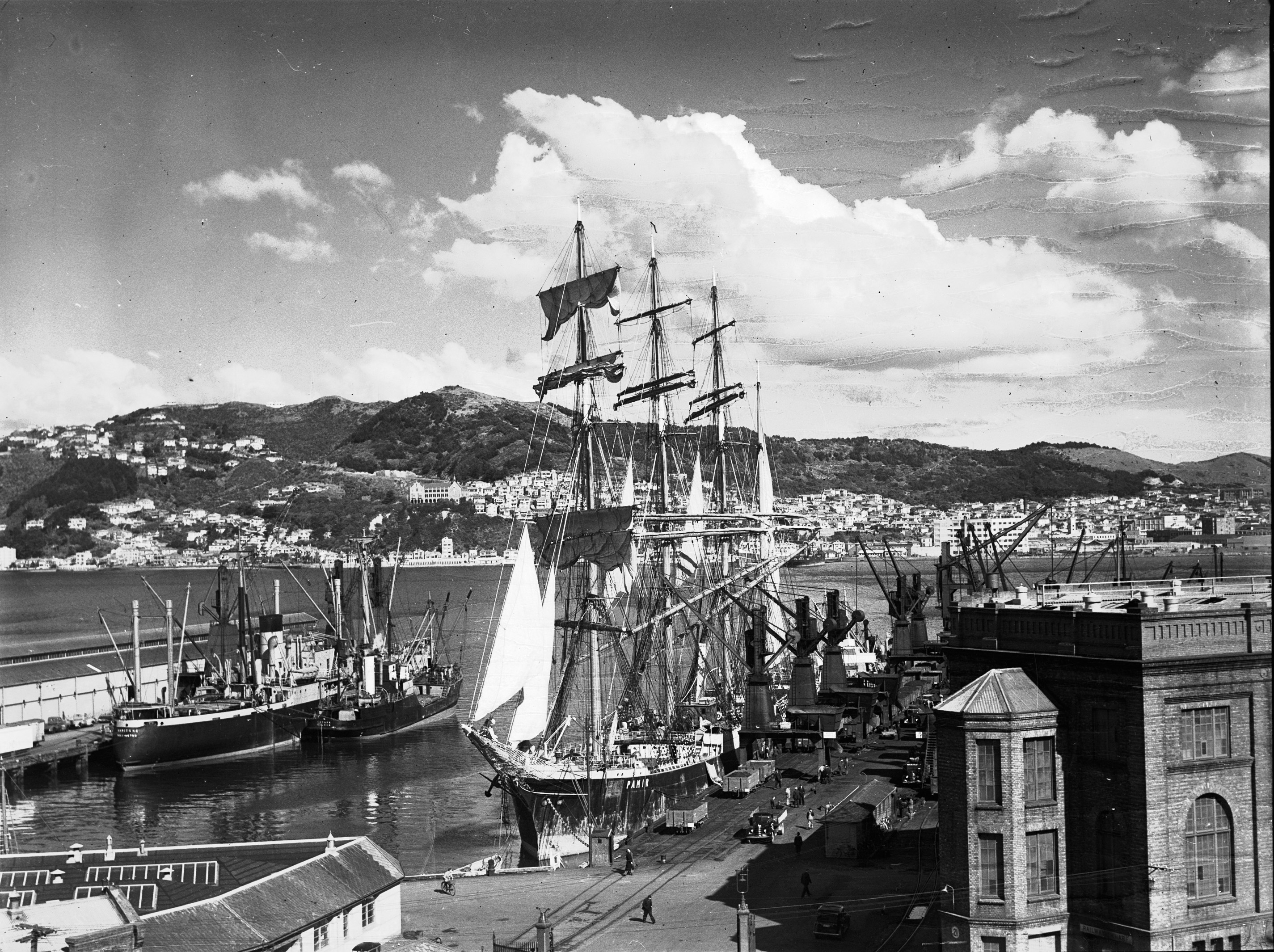
Pamir in Wellington ca. 1941

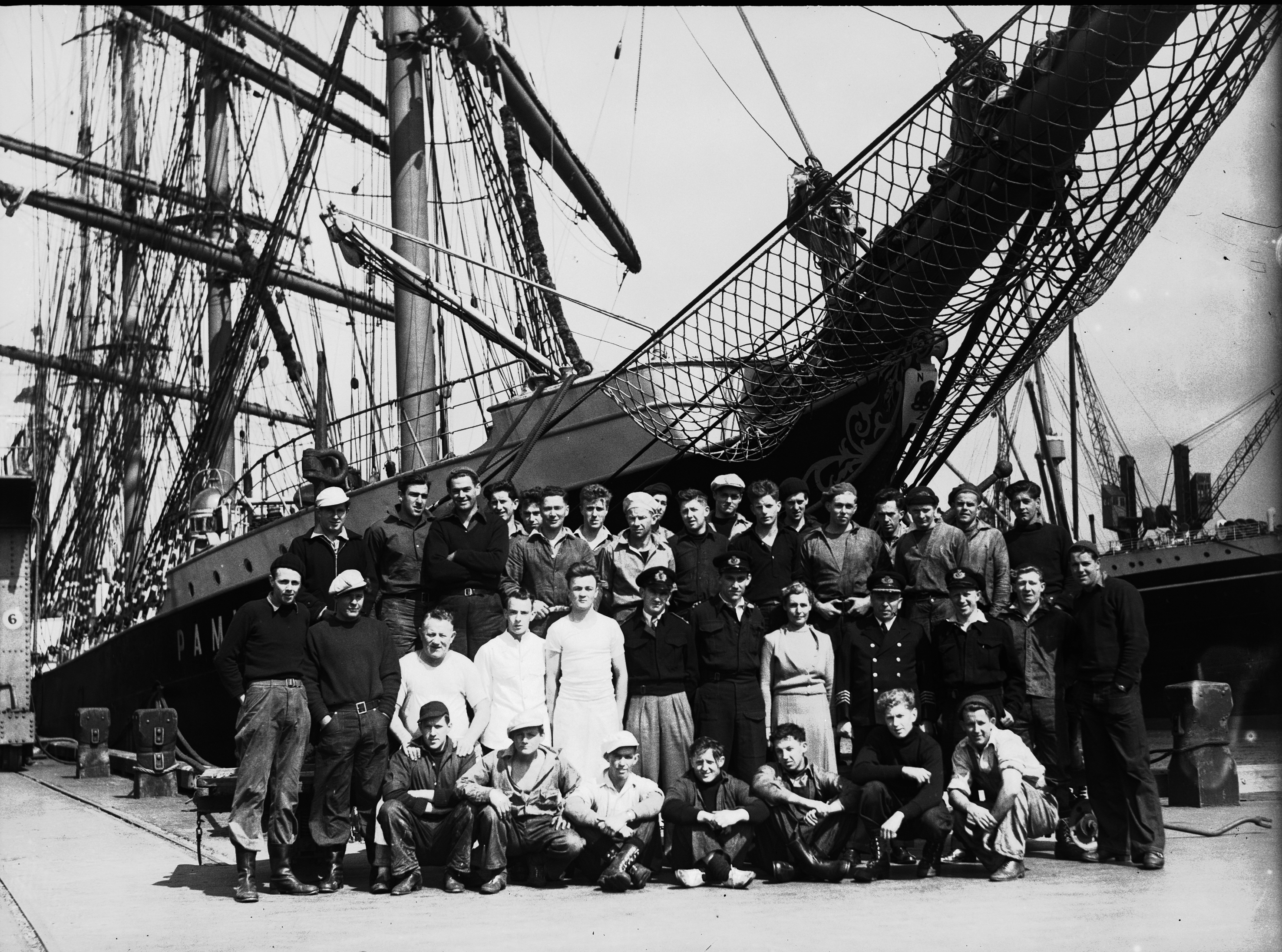
Group photograph of Pamir crew, Wellington, ca. 1940

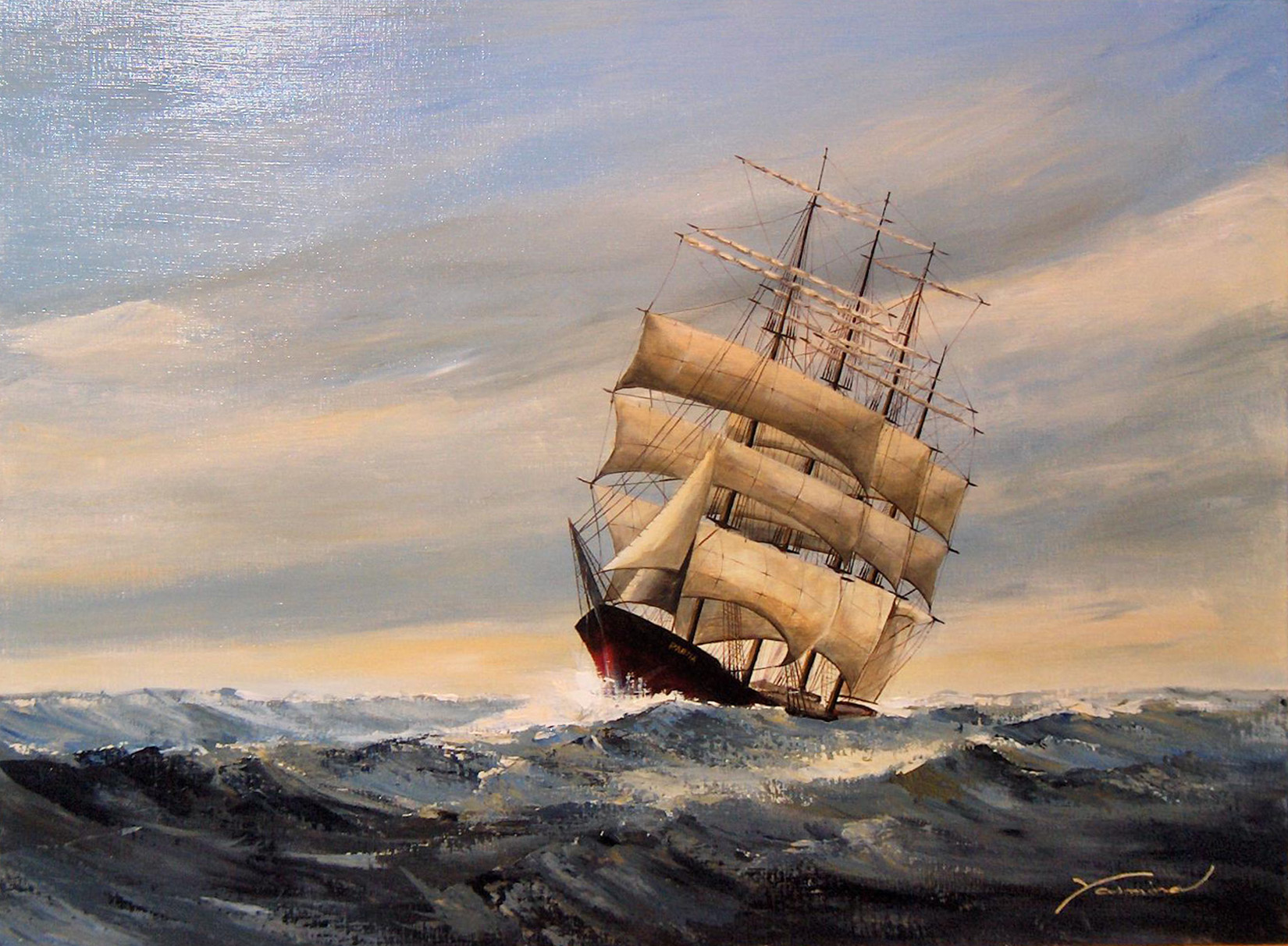
Painting of the Pamir by Yasmina (2008)

During World War II, Pamir was seized as a prize of war by the New Zealand government on 3 August 1941 while in port at Wellington. Ten commercial voyages were made under the New Zealand flag: five to San Francisco, three to Vancouver, one to Sydney and her last voyage across the Tasman from Sydney to Wellington carrying 2,700 tons of cement and 400 tons of nail wire. Weathering a storm during the last Tasman voyage is described in detail by one of the mates, Andrew Keyworth, in a letter never posted.

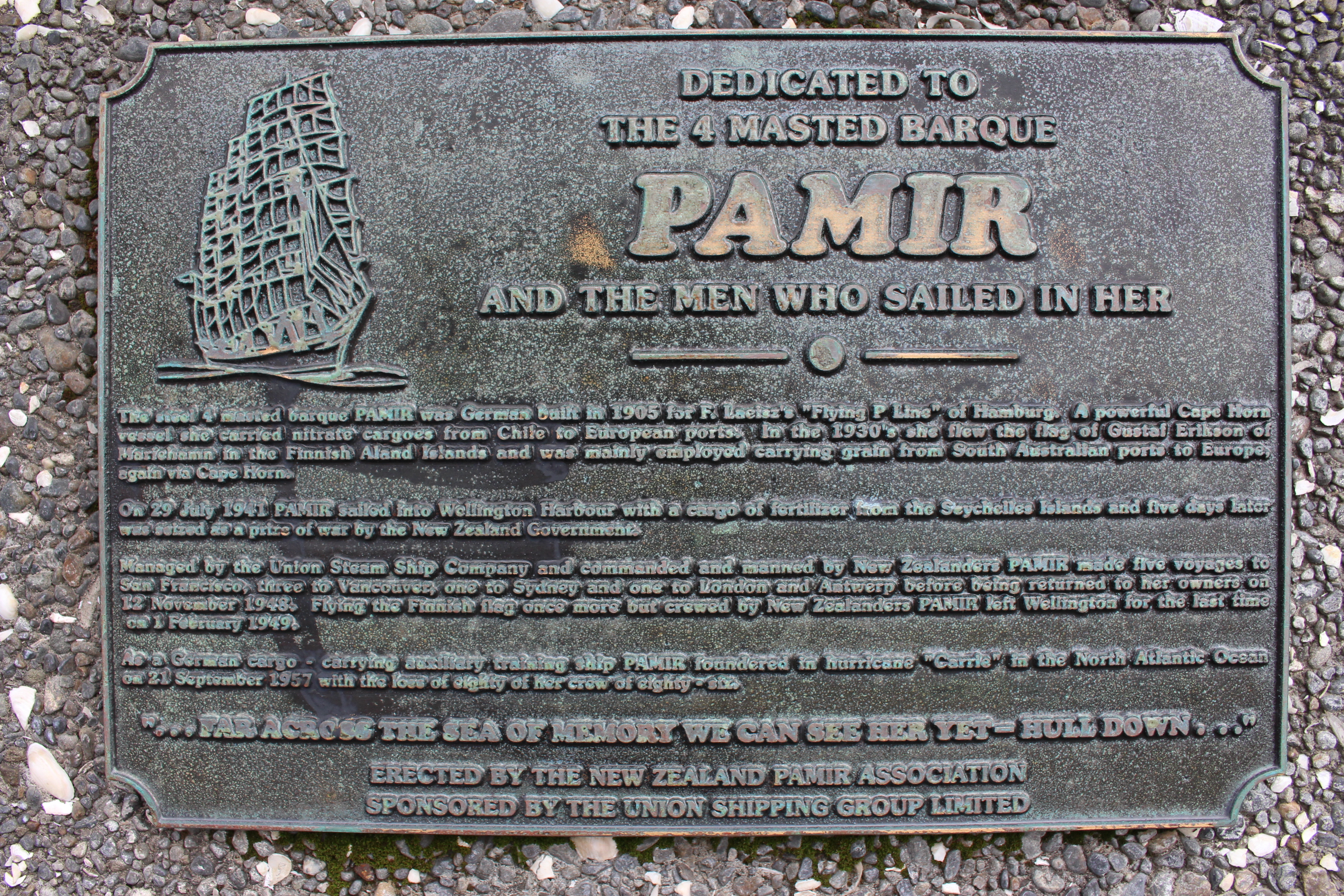
Plaque commemorating the Pamir installed on the waterfront, Wellington, New Zealand

She escaped the war unscathed despite a close call in 1943 when a Japanese submarine was spotted. Evidently as a fast-moving barque under a strong and fair wind, she did not interest the submarine's commander. After the war, she made one voyage from Wellington via Cape Horn to London, then Antwerp to Auckland and Wellington in 1948.

She was returned to the Erikson Line on 12 November 1948 at Wellington and sailed to Port Victoria on Spencer Gulf to load Australian grain. On her 128-day journey to Falmouth, she was the last windjammer carrying a commercial load around Cape Horn, on 11 July 1949.

Gustaf Erikson had died in 1947. His son Edgar found he could no longer operate her (or Passat) at a profit, owing primarily to changing regulations and union contracts governing employment aboard ships; the standard two-watch system on sailing ships was replaced by the three-watch system in use on motor-ships, requiring more crew.

In March 1951, Belgian shipbreakers paid £40,000 for her and Passat. As she was being towed to Antwerp, German shipowner Heinz Schliewen, who had sailed on her in the late 1920s, bought her (and Passat, thus often erroneously referred to as a sister ship). The ships were modernized with refurbished quarters to accommodate merchant marine trainees and fitted with an auxiliary engine, a refrigeration system for the galleys (precluding the need to carry live animals for fresh meat), modern communications equipment and water ballast tanks. Her first trip was to Brazil in 1952 with cement, to return to Germany with iron ore. Early in the outbound voyage the propeller dropped off, "much to the satisfaction of the sail-favoring crew if not the owner." The enterprise went briefly bankrupt but was bought by a new consortium of 40 German shipowners. For the next five years, the ships continued to sail between Europe and the east coast of South America, but not around Cape Horn. They were used as cargo-carrying school ships, primarily to Argentina. Although the German public supported the concept as maritime symbols and sources of national pride, the economic realities of the post-war years placed restraints on the operation. The ships were no longer profitable as freight haulers, and Pamir had increasing technical problems such as leaking decks and serious corrosion. The consortium was unable to get sufficient increased funding from German governments or contributions from shipping companies or public donations, and thus let both vessels deteriorate.

=== Last voyage ===
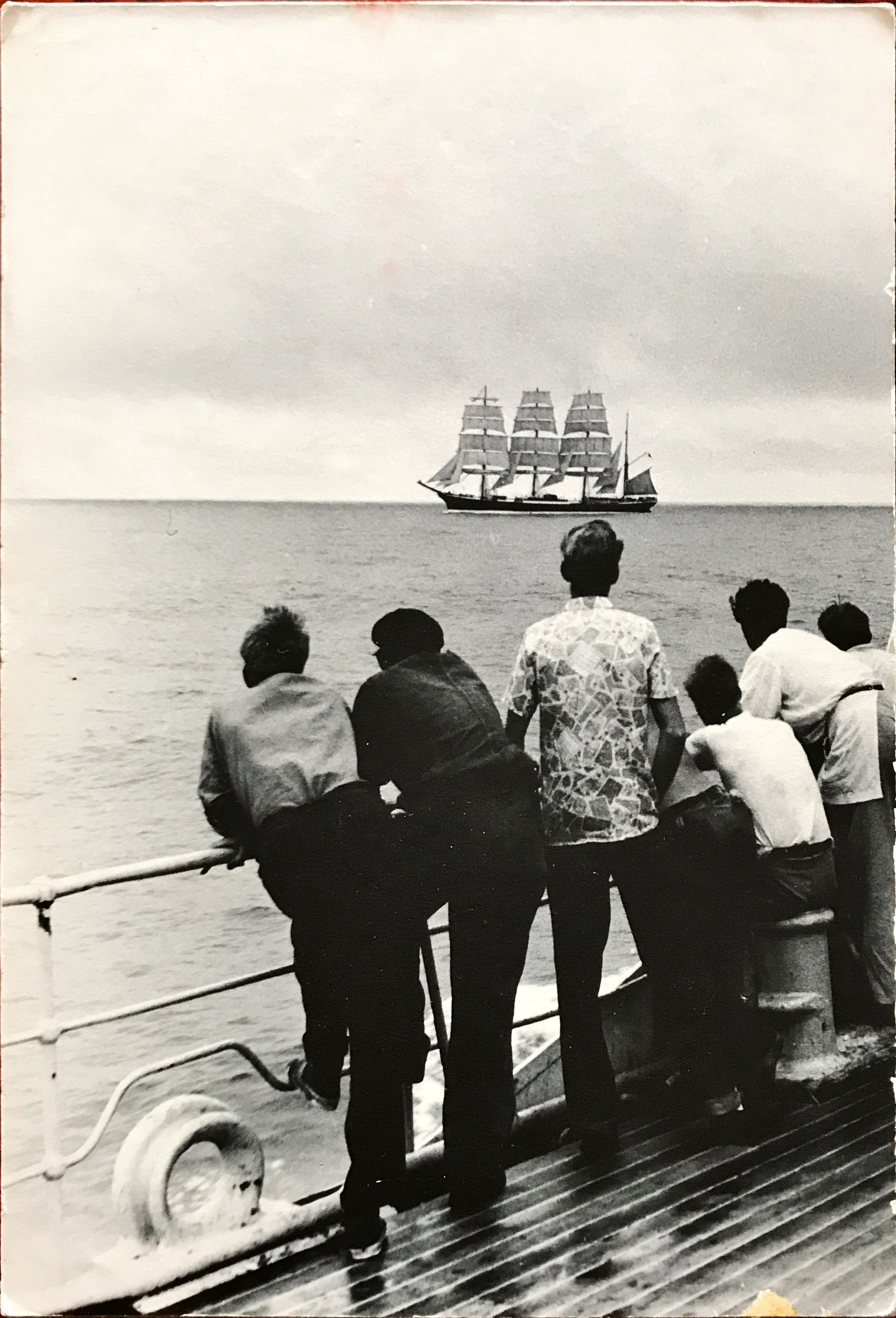
Possible last sighting of Pamir

Due to ill health, her regular captain, Hermann Eggers, had been replaced by Captain Johannes Diebitsch, who had sailed on her as a young seaman and had commanded sail-training ships, but had little experience as master of cargo-carrying sailing ships. His first officer, Rolf Köhler, was only 29 at the time, and wrote that he was "getting thin with anger" over the state of the ship and that he was intending to quit the ship's company after arriving home from the next voyage. Captain Diebitsch was criticized for being a harsh and inflexible officer.

On 10 August 1957, she left Buenos Aires for Hamburg with a crew of 86, including 52 cadets. Her cargo of 3,780 tons of barley was stored loose in the holds and ballast tanks, secured by 255 tons in sacks on top of the loose grain. Records indicate that this was one of the major mistakes implicated in the sinking – she had been held up by a dockworkers' strike, and Diebitsch, under severe pressure to sail, decided to let the trimming (the correct storage of loose cargo so that it does not shift in the hold) be done by the ship's own untrained crew. It was later found that he also had the ballast tank filled with barley. Even though testing of the roll period (the time the ship took to right itself after load transfers) showed that she was dangerously unstable, Diebitsch decided to sail.

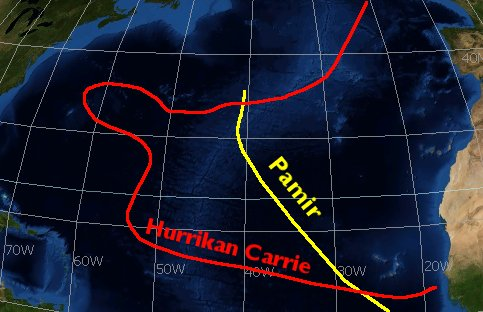
Approximate course of Pamir and track of Hurricane Carrie in September 1957

On the morning of 21 September 1957, she was caught in Hurricane Carrie before shortening sails. It was later considered that because the radio officer had also been given substantial administrative tasks (to save the money required for another officer's position), he had likely not received any of the radio storm warnings. She had also not responded to radio hails by ships that had sighted her earlier in the voyage. She soon listed severely to port in the sudden storm. As hatchways and other openings were not closed at once, they probably allowed considerable amounts of water to enter, as found by the commission which examined the probable causes of the sinking. The shipping company's lawyer at the investigation claimed that the water entered her due to a leak. According to the commission, the water caused her to list further and the grain to shift, which aggravated the list.

The captain did not order the flooding of her grain-filled ballast tanks, which would have helped her to right herself. Once she listed severely, the lifeboats could not be deployed because her port side was underwater and her starboard side was raised to an angle that did not allow use of the boats.

She sent distress signals before capsizing at 13:03 local time, and sinking after drifting keel-up for 30 minutes in the middle of the Atlantic 600 nautical miles (1,100 km; 690 mi) west-southwest of the Azores at position 35°57′N 40°20′W. Three damaged lifeboats that had come loose before or during the capsizing and the only lifeboat that had been deployed were drifting nearby. None contained any provisions or working distress signal rockets. Many sharks were later seen near the position.

A nine-day search for survivors was organized by the United States Coast Guard Cutter Absecon, but only four crewmen and two cadets were rescued alive, from two of the lifeboats. It was reported that many of the 86 men aboard had managed to reach the boats, but most died in the next three days. As none of the officers nor the captain survived, the reasons for the capsizing remained uncertain.

The sinking made headlines around the world; it was a national tragedy in Germany.

== Aftermath ==
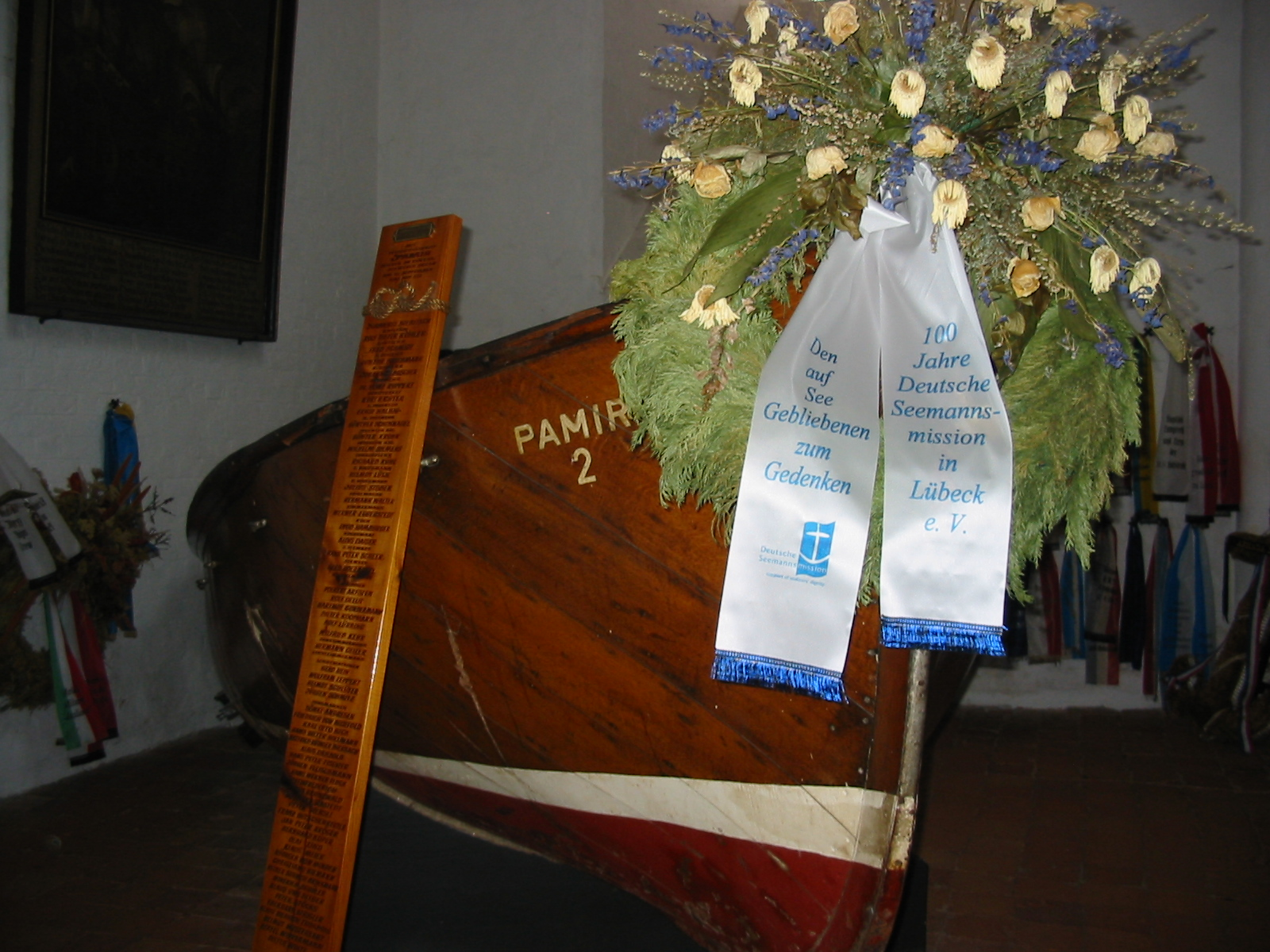
Pamir memorial in St Jakob's Church, Lübeck, showing one of the lifeboats

Pamir's last voyage was the only one in her school ship career during which she made a profit, as the insurance sum of about 2.2 million Deutsche Marks was sufficient to cover the company losses for that year. While there was no indication that this was the intention of the consortium, which was never legally blamed for the sinking, some later researchers have considered that through its neglect it was at least strongly implicated in the loss. However, the Germanischer Lloyd had recently certified her as seaworthy.

== Captains ==
- 1905–1908 Carl Martin Prützmann (DE)
- 1908–1911 Heinrich Horn (DE)
- 1911–1912 Robert Miethe (DE)
- 1912–1913 Gustav A. H. H. Becker (DE)
- 1913–1914 Wilhem Johann Ehlert (DE)
- 1914–1920 Jürgen Jürs (DE)
- 1920–1921 C. Ambrogi (IT)
- 1924–1925 Jochim Hans Hinrich Nissen (DE)
- 1925–1926 Heinrich Oellrich (DE)
- 1926–1929 Carl Martin Brockhöft (DE)
- 1929–1930 Robert Clauß (DE)
- 1930–1931 Walter Schaer (DE)
- 1931–1932 Karl Gerhard Sjögren (FI)
- 1933–1936 Mauritz Mattson (FI)
- 1936–1937 Uno Mörn (FI)
- 1937–1937 Linus Lindvall (FI)
- 1937–1941 Verner Björkfelt (FI)
- 1942–1943 Christopher Stanich (NZ)
- 1943–1944 David McLeish (NZ)
- 1944–1945 Roy Champion (NZ)
- 1946–1946 Desmond Champion (NZ)
- 1946–1948 Horace Stanley Collier (Two-Gun Pete) (NZ)
- 1948–1949 Verner Björkfelt (FI)
- 1951–1952 Paul Greiff (DE)
- 1955–1957 Hermann Eggers (DE)
- 1957 Johannes Diebitsch (DE)
