= Port Victoria, South Australia =

Port Victoria South Australia
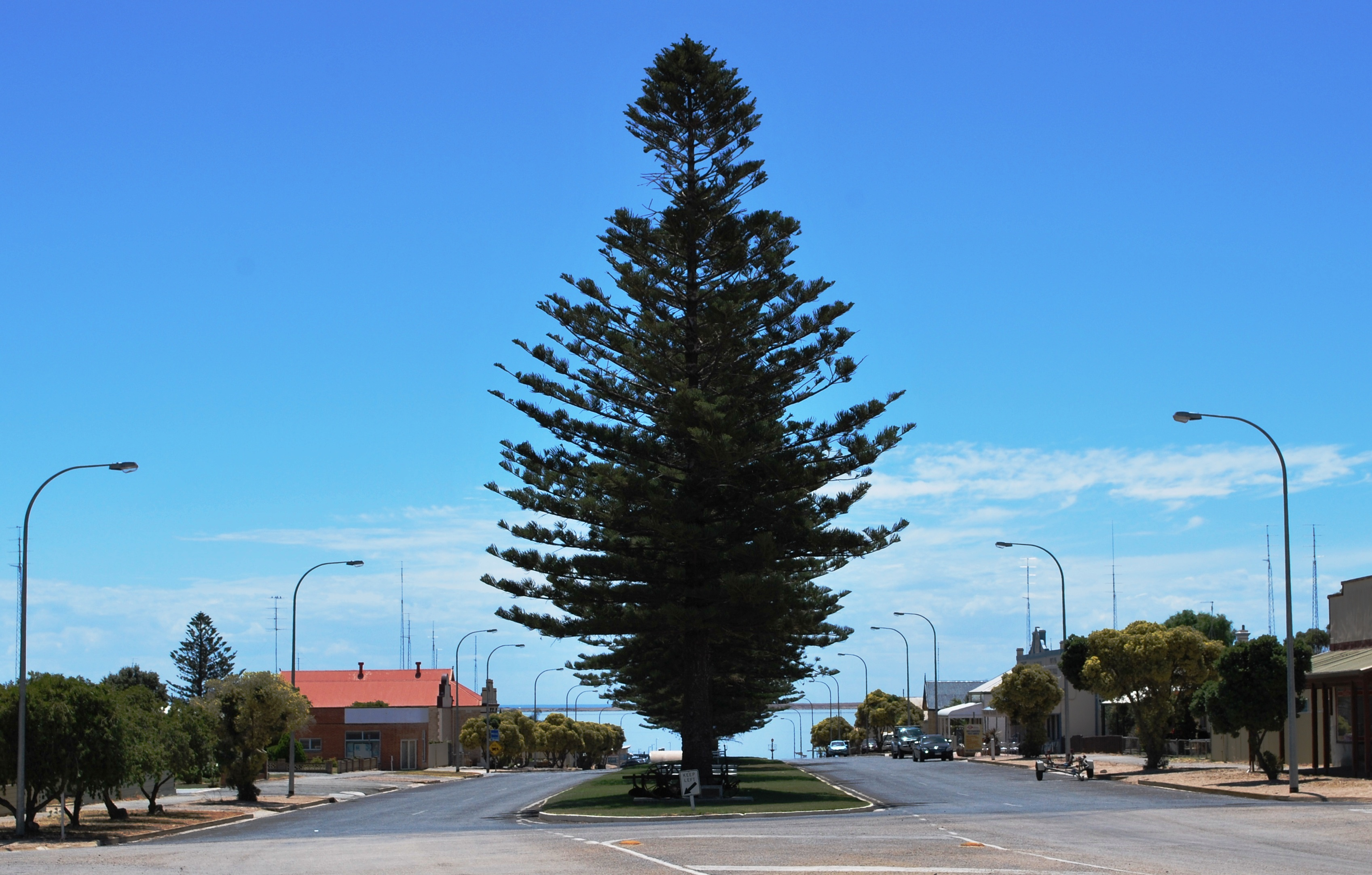
- Main street looking towards Spencer Gulf

- Coordinates: 34°29′48″S 137°29′0″E
- Population: 321 (UCL 2021)
- Postcode(s): 5573
- Elevation: 3 m (10 ft)
- Location: 190 km (118 mi) W of Adelaide; 72 km (45 mi) S of Kadina; 22 km (14 mi) SW of Maitland; 35 km (22 mi) NW of Minlaton
- LGA(s): Yorke Peninsula Council
- State electorate(s): Narungga
- Federal division(s): Grey
Localities around Port Victoria:
	Point Pearce	South Kilkerran
Spencer Gulf	Port Victoria	Urania
	Wauraltee	Wauraltee

Port Victoria (formerly Wauraltee) is a town on the west coast of Yorke Peninsula in the Australian state of South Australia.

Like many other coastal towns on the peninsula, it has a jetty and used to be a thriving port for the export of grain to England. Its anchorage is sheltered from westerly weather by nearby Wardang Island. The windjammers carrying the bagged grain called at Falmouth, England or Queenstown, Ireland for orders of where the grain was to be taken. Many of the smaller ports were visited only by coastal ketches and schooners. Port Victoria also had an anchorage offshore for the larger windjammers. These were loaded from the ketches which were in turn loaded at the jetty. The peak of the windjammer trade, the Great Grain Race, was in the 1930s; the last working sailing ships visited in 1949. As a result, Port Victoria is known as the last of the windjammer ports. This era is illustrated in the Port Victoria Maritime Museum.

It was formerly known as Wauraltee and was renamed as Port Victoria in 1940.

Today, Port Victoria is predominantly a fishing town. Activity peaks during the holiday season.

== In literature ==
Port Victoria was visited by English travel author Eric Newby in 1939, while he was crew in the 4-masted barque Moshulu. Sailors on the Moshulu, mostly Scandinavian in origin, referred to Port Victoria as "Port Veek", and it was their second Australian port-of-call after Port Lincoln; Newby did not have many complimentary things to say about the town, but he states that the inhabitants were "kind and hospitable". Moshulu was anchored off Port Victoria for just over a month, during which time she was loaded with 4,875 tons of grain – 59,000 bags which were manually loaded onto ketches at the jetty, ferried to Moshulu, and then manually loaded into Moshulu's holds. During the 1939 season, Olivebank, Pamir, Pommern and Viking were also loaded with grain at Port Victoria – some of these vessels now have streets in Port Victoria named after them. Newby wrote about his experiences on the round-trip from Ireland to South Australia in his book The Last Grain Race (1956), and several pictures of Port Victoria as it appeared in 1939 are included in his photo-essay of his voyage, Learning the Ropes.

Port Victoria is also the setting for Phillip Gwynne's classic Young Adult novel Deadly, Unna? (1998) and its sequel Nukkin Ya (2000).
