= Lehmkuhl =

Lehmkuhl (from lehm = clay + kule = pit) is a North German occupational or habitational surname, it refers to a person working or living at a clay pit. The Americanized version of the name is "Lemcool". Notable people with the surname include:

- Joakim Lehmkuhl (1895–1984), Norwegian engineer, industrialist and politician
- Kristofer Lehmkuhl (1855–1949), Norwegian politician, father of Joakim
  - Statsraad Lehmkuhl, a three-masted barque named after him
- Reichen Lehmkuhl (born 1973), American reality show winner, male model
- Wiebke Lehmkuhl (born 1983), German opera singer

== See also ==
- Lehmkuhlen
