= Eldora =

Eldora is the name of several places in the United States

- Eldora, Colorado
  - Eldora Mountain Resort
- Eldora (ship, 1937), see Boats of the Mackenzie River watershed
- Eldora (ship, 1904), a windjammer, see Placilla (ship)
- Eldora, Florida
- Eldora, Iowa
- Eldora, New Jersey
- Eldora, Pennsylvania
- Eldora Speedway, auto racing track near New Weston, Ohio; (Ships)
