= SS Bowes Castle =

A number of steamships were named Bowes Castle, including

- SS Bowes Castle (Laing, 1913), a cargo ship sunk in September 1914
- SS Bowes Castle (Tecklenburg, 1913), a cargo ship in service 1920–32
