= Schulschiff Deutschland =

1927 sail training ship

Coordinates: 53.54674°N 8.572059°E

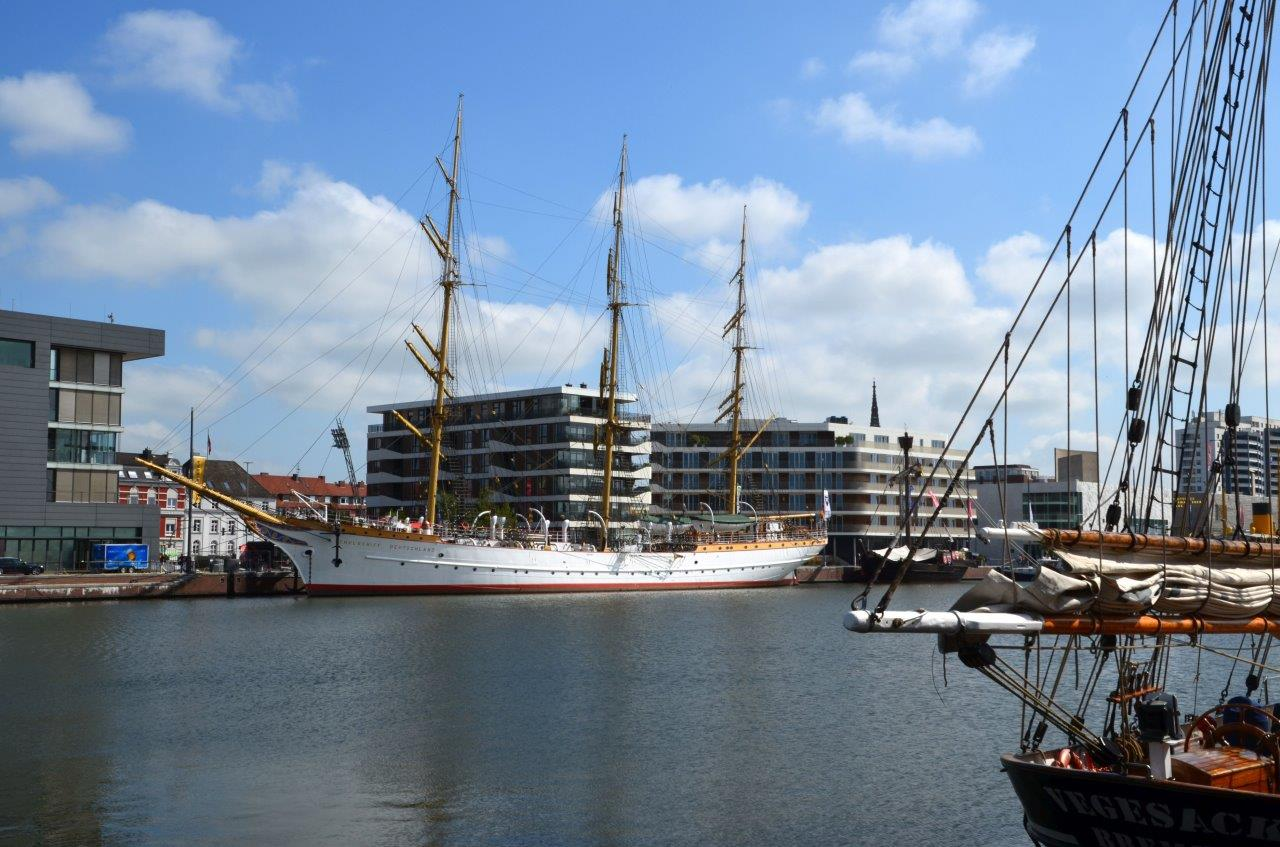
- School ship Schulschiff Deutschland

History

Germany
- Name: Schulschiff Deutschland
- Namesake: Country of Germany
- Builder: Joh. C. Tecklenborg, Geestemünde
- Launched: 14 June 1927
- Acquired: Late 1927
- Fate: Moored in Bremerhaven, as a museum ship
- Status: Museum Ship in Bremerhaven, Bremen, Germany

General characteristics
- Class & type: Sail training ship
- Length: 86m/282ft
- Beam: 12m/39ft
- Draft: 5.18m/17ft
- Propulsion: Steam, propeller, ship's sailing rig
- Complement: 158: 8 officers, 10 petty officers, 140 enlisted and merchant marine cadets

Schulschiff Deutschland (Training ship Germany/School ship Germany) is a German full-rigged sail training ship, maintained as a historical monument and museum ship. She was employed as a school ship for the merchant marine beginning in 1927. The ship is moored at the Neuer Hafen in Bremerhaven, in the Federal State of Bremen, Germany. Since the name Deutschland was at the time of its construction already assigned to an unbuilt naval warship (a pocket battleship, later renamed the Lützow), its official name is Schulschiff Deutschland.

The ship carries 25 sails with a total sail area of 1950 square meters.

The top speed on engine is 12 knots, and on sail 18.2 knots.

== History ==
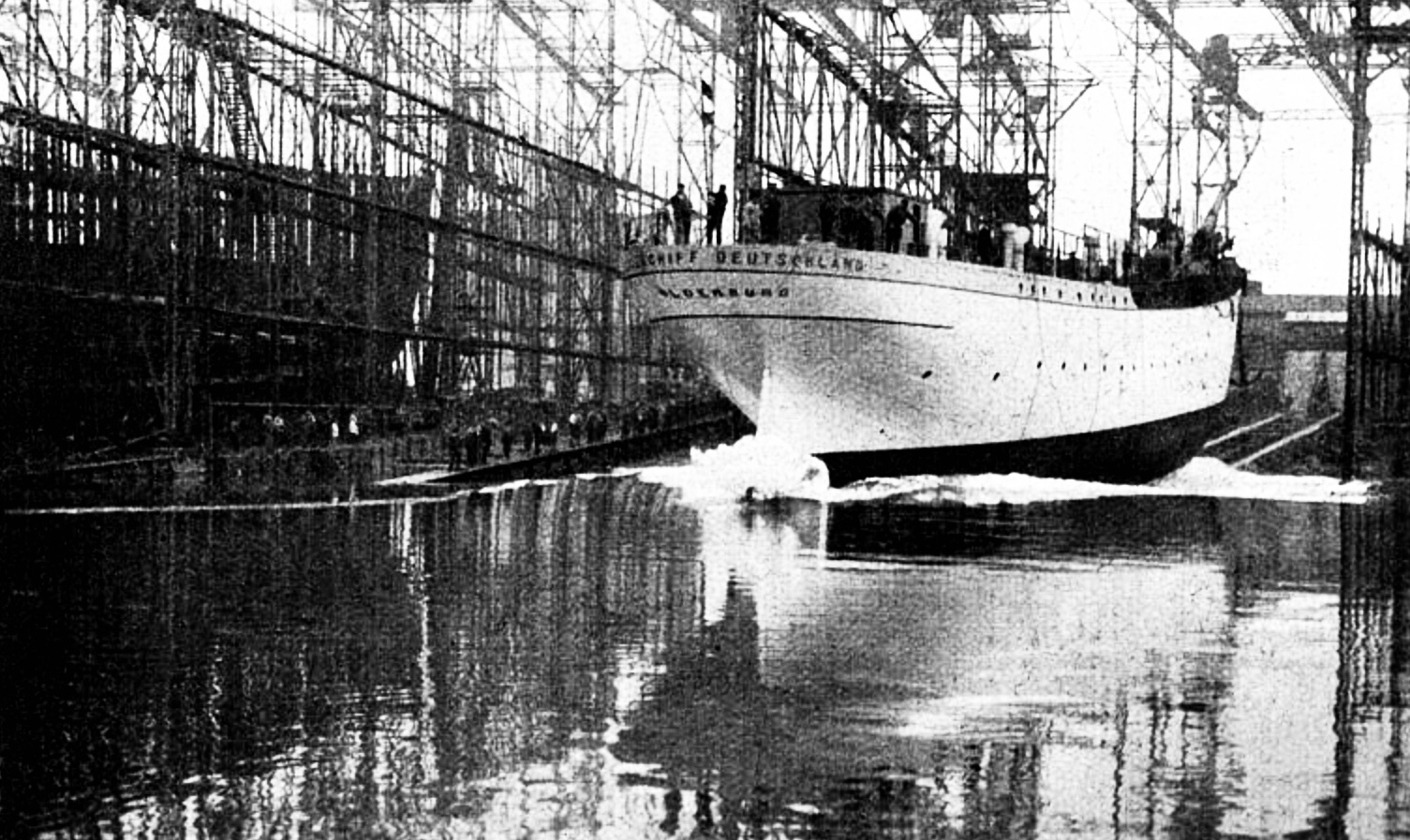
Schulschiff Deutschland launched 14 June 1927

Schulschiff Deutschland was launched on 14 June 1927 at the Joh. C. Tecklenborg shipyard in Geestemünde (today Bremerhaven) for the Deutscher Schulschiff-Verein (German Training Ship Association) as its fourth merchant marine training ship.

From 1927 to 1939 she undertook training trips overseas and in the North and Baltic Seas.

During World War II cruises were limited, and these trips were only held in the Baltic Sea. Her brief stint as a hospital ship in the final months of World War II saved her from having to be delivered to the Allies as war reparation.

Between 1949 and 1952, she served three years as a hostel before becoming a stationary training ship in Bremen for seamen students.

In 1994 she was protected by law as a floating monument and renovated in 1995/1996 in Bremen-Vegesack.

Until July 2001 ship mechanic students lived on board, taking their classroom training in a school center in Bremen. With the cessation of such training in Bremen, this aspect of the ship's Nautical School was closed.

Schulschiff Deutschland is located in Bremerhaven where she can be viewed as a maritime memorial, used as overnight accommodation, or booked for events.

== Voyages ==
For training in maritime practice up until the Second World War the ship made regular ocean voyages. In the winter destinations were overseas (mostly in German colonial Africa and in South America), while in the summer ports in the North and Baltic Sea were destinations. From 1927 to 1939, twelve overseas trips were made. From 1928 to 1944 seventeen North Sea and Baltic Sea tours were made.

Between trips Elsfleth was the ship's base as owing to the draft of the ship its registered home port of Oldenburg could not be used.

For Sail Bremerhaven 2005, the Schulschiff Deutschland was re-entered on the ship list.

== Captains ==
- Reinhold Walker (1927–1933)
- Walter von Zatorski (1933–1936)
- Ernst Sieck (1936–1938)
- Otto Bauer (1938–1945)
- O. Hattendorf (1945–1953)
- K. Köppl (1953–1961)
- O. Hattendorf (1961–1977)
- Harm Müller-Röhlck (1977–2002)

== Sister ships ==
The three sister ships of Schulschiff Deutschland also survive:

- Dar Pomorza (originally Prinzess Eitel Friedrich)
- Duchesse Anne (originally Großherzogin Elisabeth)
- Statsraad Lehmkuhl (originally Großherzog Friedrich August)
