= Joh. C. Tecklenborg =

Former shipyard in Bremerhaven, Germany

Joh. C. Tecklenborg was a German shipbuilding company, located at the river Geeste in Bremerhaven. About 440 ships of different types, including many famous tall sailing ships were built at the yard. Founded in 1841, it was finally closed in 1928.

== History ==
The beginning dates back to September 30, 1841, when Johann (Jan) Simon Abegg and P.H. Ulrichs started the small shipyard "Abegg & Co" in Bremerhaven near the mouth of the river Geeste. This venture was financed by the entrepreneur and shipowner Franz Tecklenborg (1807–1886) from Bremen. In 1843 Franz Tecklenborg took over all activities but handed the operational responsibility to his brother the shipbuilder Johann Carl Tecklenborg (1820–1873). From this point on the shipyard operated under the name "Johann C.Tecklenborg". When Franz Tecklenborg decided to extend the fleet of his shipping company based in Bremen he ordered 19 vessels at the yard of his brother in the following years.

To cope with rising demand of ships the shipyard opened a new site across the river Geeste in Geestemüde in 1852. In 1872 Franz Tecklenborgs youngest son Eduard Tecklenborg (1849–1926) entered into the company and took on responsibility. After the death of Johann Carl Tecklenborg in 1873 the technical management was handed over to the talented engineer Georg Wilhelm Claussen (1845–1919).

As of 1880 iron and then steel replaced wood as the core material for the hull of all ships build by Joh. C.Tecklenborg. The shipyard build several of the so-called Flying P-Liners. In 1897 the company was converted into a stock cooperation and operated as Joh. C. Tecklenborg Schiffswerft- und Maschinenfabrik AG. In 1914 over 4300 people were employed by the shipyard.

In 1926 Tecklenborg became member of the Deschimag - a cooperation of several more or less important German shipyards under the leadership of Bremen's shipyard AG Weser. But already two years later in 1928 the Tecklenborg shipyard was finally closed. Reasons were the low market trend of new construction of merchant ships because of the upcoming economic crisis and the following global depression in the 1930th, the internal local competition between the both great shipyards in Bremerhaven Tecklenborg and G. Seebeck, but last not least the competition to the leading company AG Weser. About 2,500 people lost their jobs in Bremerhaven at that time.

The last ship delivered by Tecklenborg was the Schulschiff Deutschland in 1927.

== Ships built by Joh. C. Tecklenborg (selection) ==
- 1846, Rappahannock, first ship of the yard, the type of ship is unknown
- 1899, Frankfurt, the first and closest vessel to respond to distress signals from the RMS Titanic in April 1912. She was surrendered to the United Kingdom at the conclusion of the First World War, and was scrapped in Japan.
- 1914, Pungo, motor ship, later named Möwe, in WW I used as auxiliary cruiser and mine-layer, sunk by RAF in Norway in the Second World War (named Oldenburg)
- 1927, Schulschiff Deutschland, last ship of the yard, full-rigged three-mast sailing ship without auxiliary-engine, today museum-ship in Bremerhaven("White Swan of the Lower Weser")

=== Tall ships ===
- Placilla (1892)
- Pisagua (1893)
- Potosi (1895)
- Preussen (1902)
- Statsraad Lehmkuhl (1914)

=== Ocean liners ===
- Frankfurt (1899)
- Scharnhorst (1904)
- Bülow (1906)
- Prinz Friedrich Wilhelm (1908)
- Johann Heinrich Burchard (1914) later named SS Reliance

=== Cargo ships ===
- Hessen (1905) – later named HMAT Bulla
- Ockenfels (1910) – later named USS Pequot
- Freienfels (1910) – later named Empire Defender
- Solfels (1913) – later named Empire Advocate
- Pungo (1914) – later named SMS Möwe
- Geierfels (1918) - later named City of Bagdad
- Vogtland (1919) – later named Cambridge

=== Naval ships ===
- German minesweeper M 107 (1918)

== Ships still afloat ==
- Großherzog Friedrich August (barque, 1914); today's name Statsraad Lehmkuhl
- Padua (1926); now called Kruzenstern
- Schulschiff Deutschland (1927); serves as museum ship in Bremerhaven
- Schulschiff Großherzogin Elisabeth (1901); named Duchesse Anne in Dunkirk
- Seefalke (tugboat, 1924); museum ship in Bremerhaven
