= Duchesse Anne =

French 3-masted sailing ship

Coordinates: 51°02′15″N 2°22′20″E

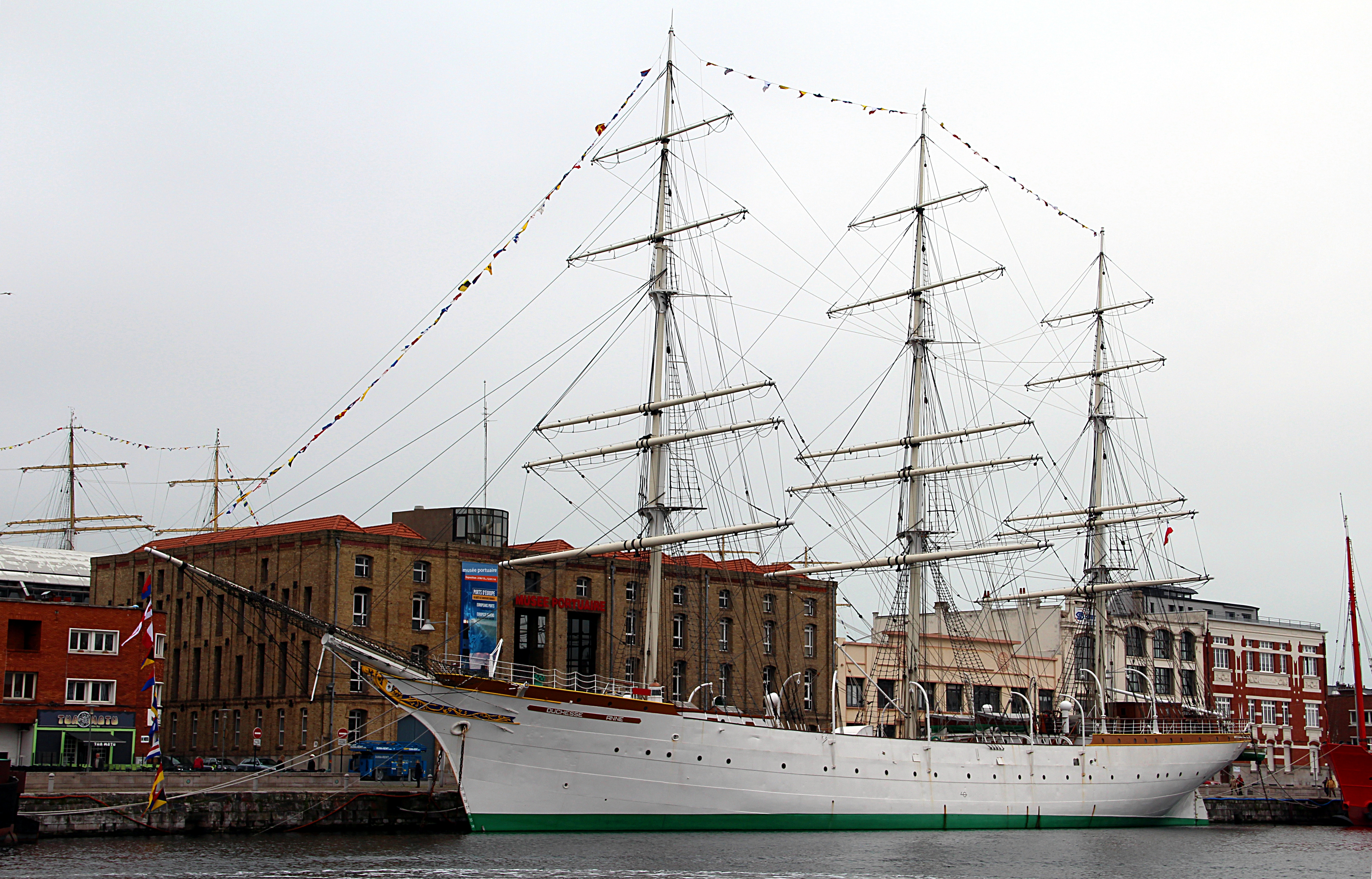
- Duchesse Anne permanently moored in Dunkirk

History

Germany
- Name: Großherzogin Elisabeth (Grand Duchess Elisabeth)
- Owner: Deutscher Schulschiffverein
- Builder: Johann C. Tecklenborg, Bremerhaven
- Launched: 7 March 1901
- Nickname(s): Lisbeth
- Fate: Handed over to France as a war reparation, August 15, 1946

France
- Name: Duchesse Anne
- Namesake: Duchess Elisabeth Alexandrine of Mecklenburg-Schwerin
- Owner: French Navy (1946–1981); City of Dunkirk (1981–present)
- Acquired: 15 August 1946
- Homeport: Dunkirk
- Status: Museum ship

General characteristics
- Displacement: 1,250 tons
- Length: 92 m (302 ft)
- Beam: 11.9 m (39 ft)
- Draft: 5.45 m (17.9 ft)
- Notes: Sail area: 2,060 m²

Duchesse Anne (formerly called Großherzogin Elisabeth) is the last remaining full-rigged ship under the French flag. She was built in 1901 with a steel hull by the yard of Joh. C. Tecklenborg of Bremerhaven-Geestemünde (Germany) according to plans drawn by Georg W. Claussen. The mainmast is 48 m tall and 25 sails were rigged. She was utilised as a training ship for young aspiring sailors in the German merchant marine.

== History ==
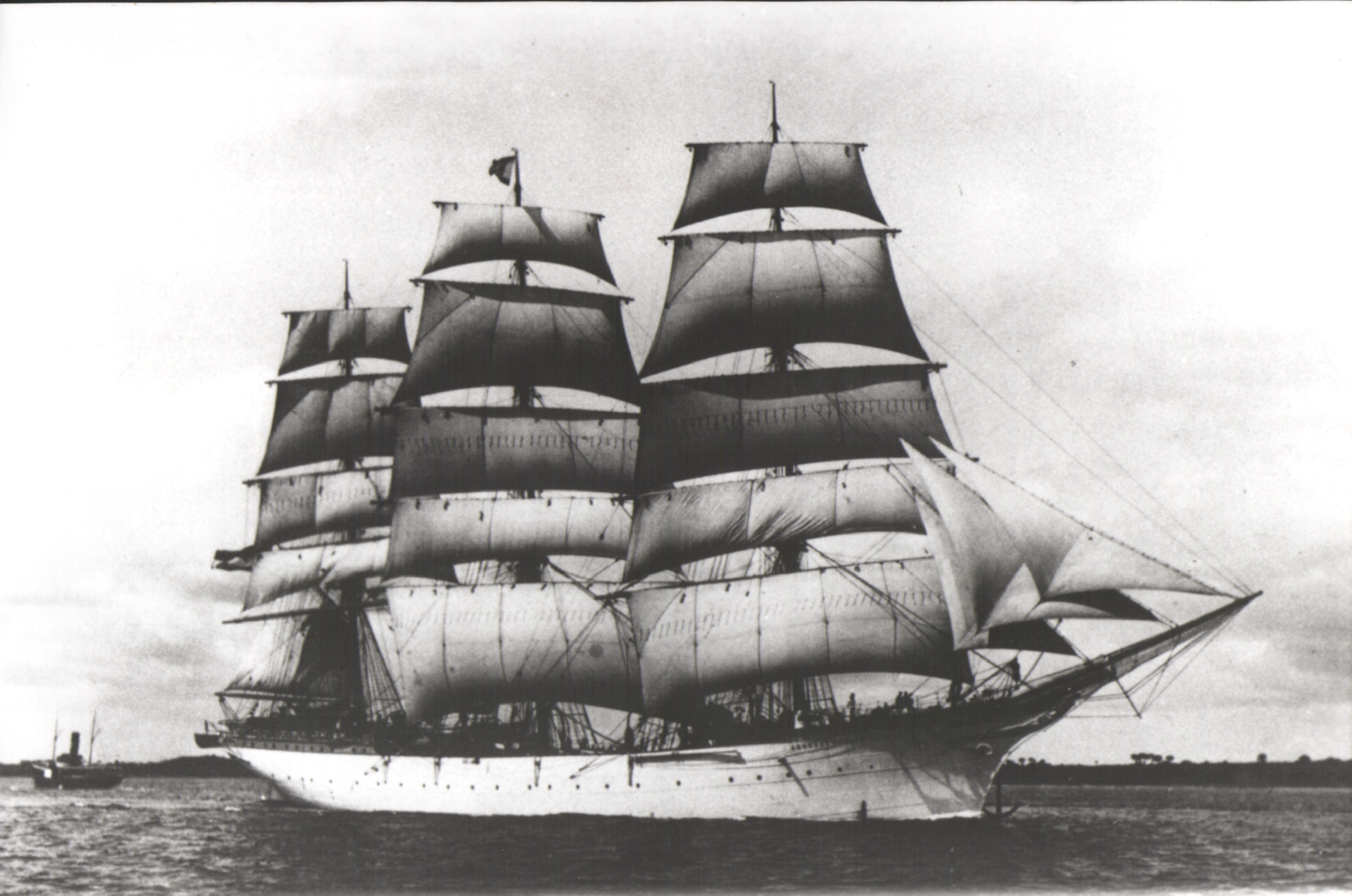
Sailing as Großherzogin Elisabeth in 1913

The ship was originally owned by Deutscher Schulschiff-Verein of Berlin as a training ship before 1932, before she was sold to a Hamburg-Finkenwerder seamen's school in 1932. Shortly after the war ended, she was relinquished to French authorities as war reparations and renamed Duchesse Anne, being stationed in Lorient and Brest.

During her tenure, she sailed near the Baltic Sea along with the South Atlantic for over three decades under cadet training operations. She was purchased by the Dunkirk city council in 1981; Another association subsequently began renovations upon her several months later. She arrived at her final resting place in late-August 1998, permanently moored at the Harbour Museum in Dunkirk. Upon its centenary in 2001, she officially opened to public visitation. The ship has been classified a historical monument since 5 November 1982.

== Similar ships ==
Several other training windjammers of the German "Deutscher Schulschiff-Verein" also survive to this day:

- Dar Pomorza (originally Prinzess Eitel Friedrich)
- Schulschiff Deutschland
- Statsraad Lehmkuhl (originally Großherzog Friedrich August)
