= HMAT Bulla =

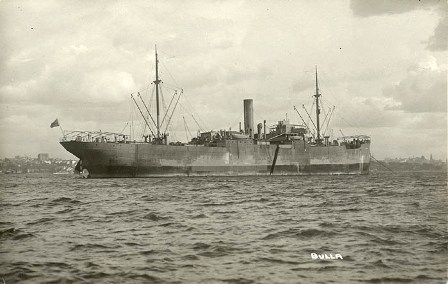
- The ship as Hessen

History

Germany
- Name: Hessen
- Owner: Norddeutscher Lloyd
- Port of registry: Bremen
- Builder: Joh. C. Tecklenborg, Geestemunde
- Yard number: 207
- Launched: 1905
- Christened: 2 September 1905
- Completed: 9 November 1905
- Out of service: 1914
- Identification: code letters QJBP
- Fate: Seized by Australia in World War I

Australia
- Name: HMAT Bulla
- Operator: Commonwealth Line
- Acquired: 1914
- Out of service: 1926
- Identification: A45
- Fate: Sold

Germany
- Name: Weissesee
- Operator: W. Schuchmann
- Acquired: 1926
- Out of service: 1943
- Fate: Sunk by aircraft 25 July 1943

General characteristics
- Class & type: Franken-class cargo ship
- Tonnage: 5,099 GRT, 3,206 NRT
- Length: 409.3 ft (124.8 m)
- Beam: 52.7 ft (16.1 m)
- Depth: 27.9 ft (8.5 m)
- Decks: 2
- Installed power: 533 NHP; 3,000 ihp (2,200 kW)
- Propulsion: 1 × quadruple-expansion engine; 1 × screw
- Speed: 12 knots (22 km/h)

HMAT Bulla was built as the steamer SS Hessen for the German Line Norddeutscher Lloyd in 1905. It could carry 3300 tons deadweight.

== 1914 seizure ==
The NDL liner Hessen was seized by Australian forces on 3 September 1914, when it sailed from Bremen into Melbourne, the German crew being unaware of the outbreak of World War I. The vessel did not have a wireless radio, and had sailed from Antwerp on 19 July 1914, with hostilities in progress from 4 August 1914. The seven crew and master Dietrich Reimers were taken into custody then released on parole in accordance with Articles 5(2), 6, and 7, of the Hague Convention. Its cargo was then offloaded in Sydney and Brisbane.

== Australian WWI troopship ==
It became a troop transport for the war, becoming HMAT Hessen (A45) by February 1915, and by September 1915, renamed as the HMAT Bulla (A45). It was initially under the command of Captain R. A. T. Wilson, initially ferrying troops and horses to Egypt, and formed part of the Gallipoli campaign. It was subsequently considered unsuitable for troop transport. Captain E. Clutterbuck took over from Wilson, where the vessel was part of a storeship for that campaign.

May 1919 saw the steamer return from London with trophies of war for the Australian War Museum.

== Post-WWI cargo steamer ==
It was transferred to the Commonwealth Government Line of Steamers in 1918, with Captain A. R. Pascall being the master about this time. In 1920 the SS Bulla was used to transport 6400 bales of wool and 1400 bags of barley from Adelaide to London via Durban.

The steamer was sold for £13 500 in 1926 to W. Schuchmann, who renamed it Weissesee (meaning 'white sea').

== WW2 sinking ==
Weissesee was bombed and sunk by aircraft at Hamburg, Germany, on 25 July 1943. The wreck was raised in 1949 and scrapped.
