= Dar Pomorza =

1909 Polish sail training ship and museum

Coordinates: 54.5194°N 18.5529°E

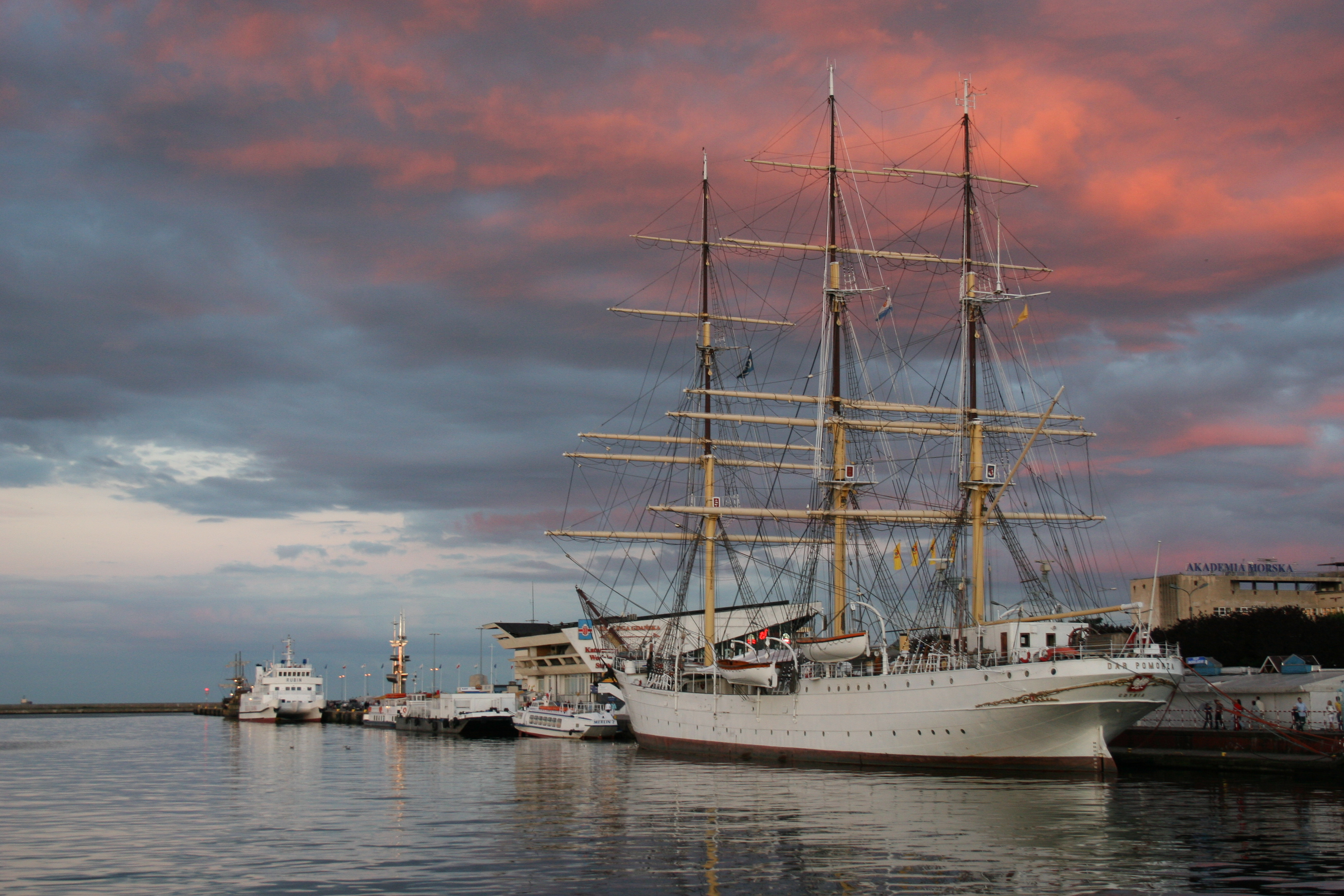
- Dar Pomorza in 2008

History

German Empire
- Name: Prinzess Eitel Friedrich
- Builder: Blohm & Voss, Hamburg
- Launched: 1909
- Fate: Taken by UK as war reparations Sold to Poland

Poland
- Name: Dar Pomorza
- Acquired: 1930
- Decommissioned: 4 August 1982
- Identification: IMO number: 5086451
- Status: Museum ship in Gdynia

General characteristics
- Class & type: Sailing ship, full-rigged ship
- Tons burthen: 1561 gross tons, 525 net tons
- Length: 80 m (260 ft) (93 m full length)
- Beam: 12.6 m (41 ft)
- Propulsion: Auxiliary engine, 430 HP
- Sail plan: Full-rigged ship, 1900 or 2100 square metres of sail
- Complement: Crew of 28, plus 150-200 cadets

Dar Pomorza

The Dar Pomorza (English: Gift of Pomerania) is a Polish full-rigged sailing ship built in 1909 which is preserved in Gdynia as a museum ship. She has served as a sail training ship in Germany, France, and Poland. Dar Pomorza won the Cutty Sark Trophy in 1980.

== History ==
The ship was built in 1909 by Blohm & Voss and dedicated in 1910 by Deutscher Schulschiff-Verein as the German training ship Prinzess Eitel Friedrich, named for Duchess Sophia Charlotte of Oldenburg. Her yard no. was 202, her hull was launched on 12 October 1909. She was commission on 6 April 1910. In 1920, following World War I, the ship was taken as war-reparations by Great Britain, then brought to France, where she was assigned to the seamen's school at St-Nazaire under the name Colbert. The ship was in 1927 given to Baron de Forrest as compensation for the loss of a sailing yacht. Due to the high costs of refurbishing the ship, she was sold in 1929.

Still bearing the name Prinzess Eitel Friedrich, she was bought by the Polish community of Pomerania for £7,000, as the new training ship for the Maritime School in Gdynia. She was given the name "Dar Pomorza" (Gift of Pomerania). In 1930 the ship was repaired and fitted with an auxiliary diesel engine. The experience gained during rebuilding works enabled Danish shipbuilders of Nakskov to build a sail training vessel for their country, the Danmark (still in service).

The ship made her first voyage under Polish colours temporarily named "Pomorze" (Pomerania in Polish). (Possibly the name was later changed to avoid similarity to the unfortunate German pre-dreadnought battleship Pommern (Pomerania in German), lost with all hands during the Battle of Jutland in June 1916.) This first voyage was made under tow of two Dutch tugs ("Poolzee" and "Witte Zee") with a party of Polish and Dutch runners aboard, starting on 26 Dec. 1929 from St. Nazaire, and ending on 9 Jan. 1930 at Nakskov, the ship narrowly escaping destruction in a gale off the Brittany coast. The voyage later became famous through some accounts, including one written by Mr T. Meissner, the ship's first mate.

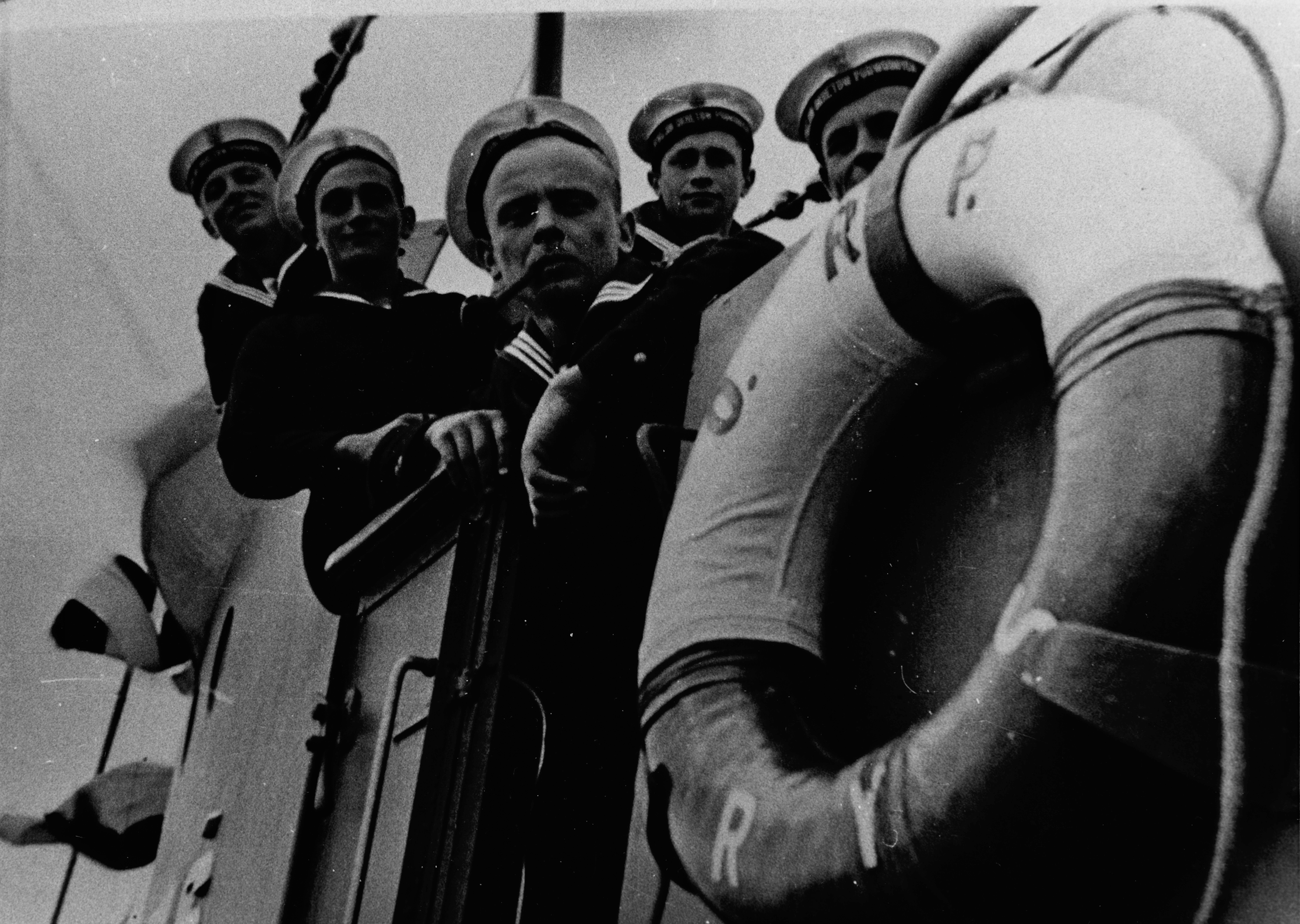
Polish marines aboard the Dar Pomorza in Stockholm in spring 1940.

During the following years, rebuilt and converted into training unit fitted i/a with an auxiliary Diesel engine, she was used as a training ship, receiving the nickname "White Frigate". In 1934-1935 she travelled around the world (via the Panama Canal). During that voyage, she called at many ports as the first ship ever under the Polish flag. In 1937 she became the first ship under Polish Colours to round Cape Horn. In 1938 she took part in the meeting of Baltic sail training ships at Stockholm, regarded as predecessor of all post-war Operation Sail meetings, winning i. a. special respect the skipper of Norwegian sail training vessel Christian Radich. During World War II she was interned in Stockholm. After the war, she was brought to Communist Poland and used as a training ship again.

In 1967 she made a 'second debut', calling at Montreal, Canada, during the Expo-Fair. In the 1970s she took part in several Operation Sail and Cutty Sark Tall Ships' Races, winning her first race in 1972, taking 3rd place in 1973, 4th in 1974 and 1st place in the Cutty Sark Trophy in 1980. In 1976, during the Operation Sail '76 in the US, her retiring skipper Kazimierz Jurkiewicz was officially greeted by Mr Kjell Thorsen, skipper of the Norwegian "Christian Radich". The "Dar Pomorza" is one of several Blohm & Voss-built tall ships. Her importance to the world's maritime heritage is her origin - she is the younger sister of the (still existing) Grossherzogin Elisabeth, the world's first purpose-built sail training ship. She is the first ship to carry the Polish Colours around the world in one voyage (1934–35).

On 15 September 1981 she undertook her last voyage to the Finnish harbour of Kotka, finishing it 13 days later. On 4 August 1982 she was decommissioned and festively replaced as a training ship by the Dar Młodzieży.

=== Museum ship ===
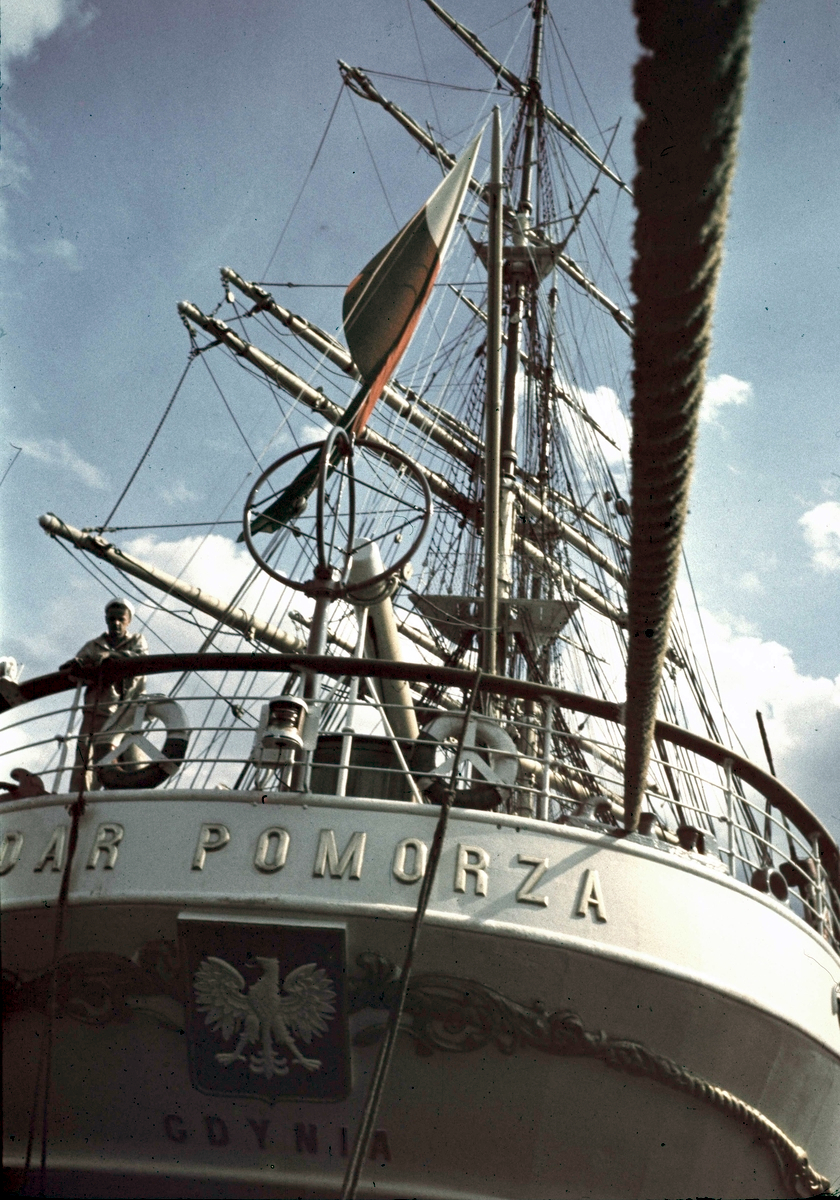
Dar Pomorza visit in Stockholm (1938).

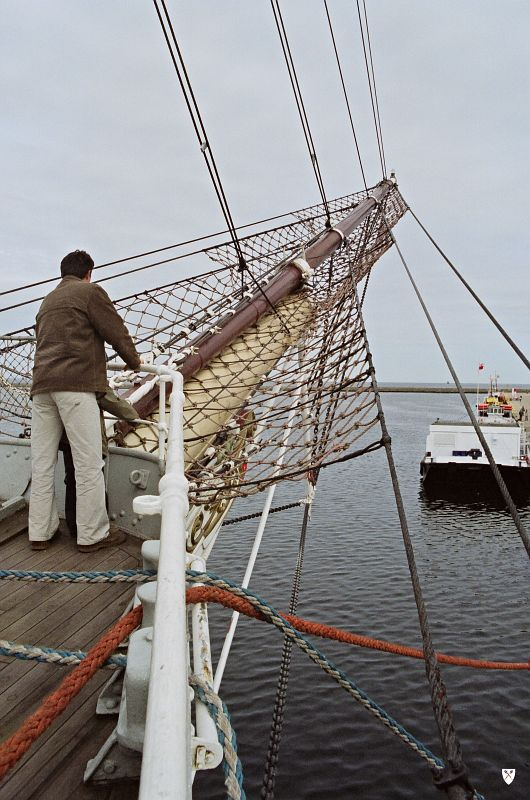
Bowsprit of Dar Pomorza.

Since 27 May 1983 she has been a museum ship in Gdynia (next to the Błyskawica). She is part of the Gdańsk National Maritime Museum collection. In October 2009 the Dar Pomorza celebrated her 100th birthday, including a second christening by Mrs Barbara Szczurek, wife of the Mayor of Gdynia.

Her speed under sail averaged 5 knots, with a 17 knots maximum. Her auxiliary engine was of the type used in German U-boats, and her horn, installed after the war, was from the German battleship Gneisenau, scuttled on 27/28 March 1945 at one of Gdynia's harbour entrances.

== Sister ships ==
Dar Pomorza's three sister ships survive:

- Duchesse Anne (originally Großherzogin Elisabeth)
- Schulschiff Deutschland
- Statsraad Lehmkuhl (originally Großherzog Friedrich August)

== See also ==
- List of large sailing vessels

== Gallery ==
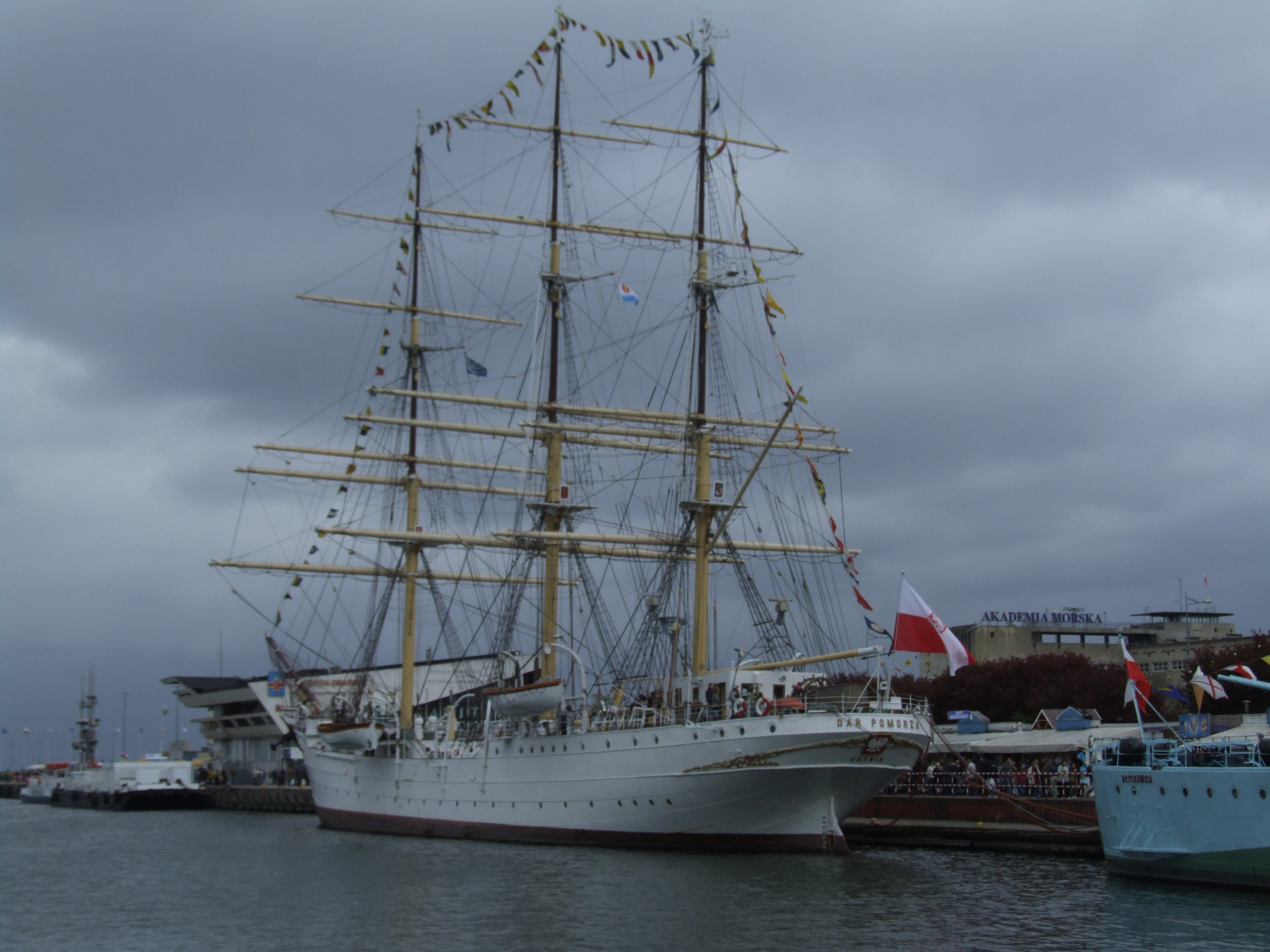

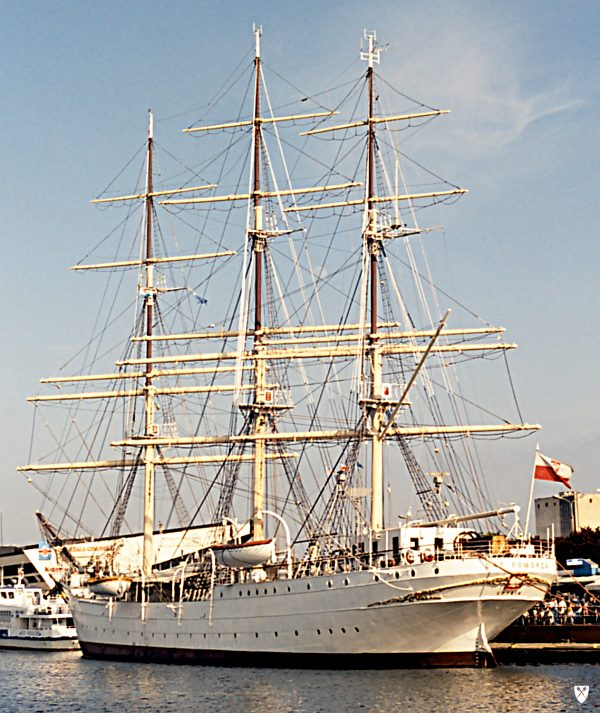

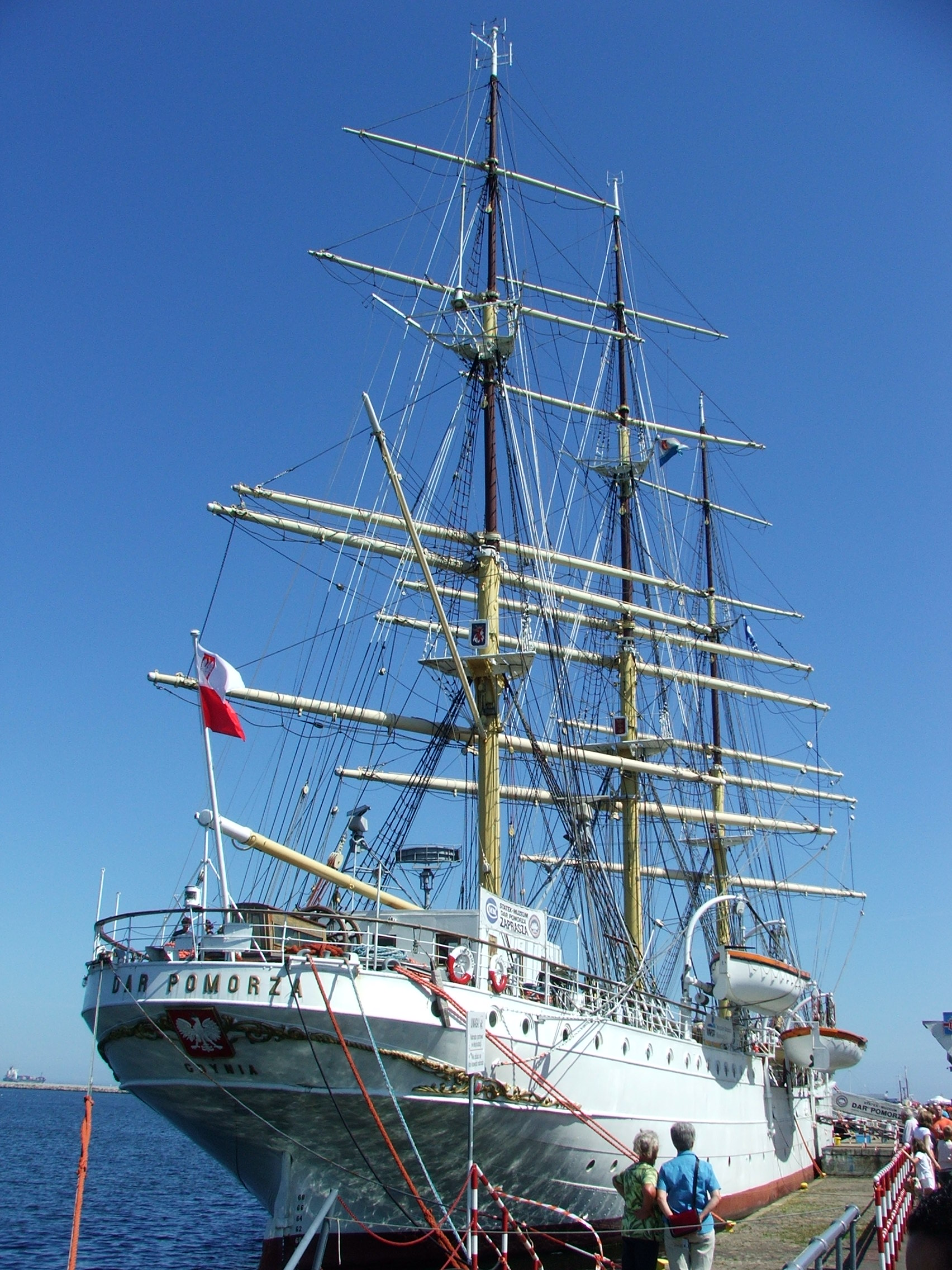

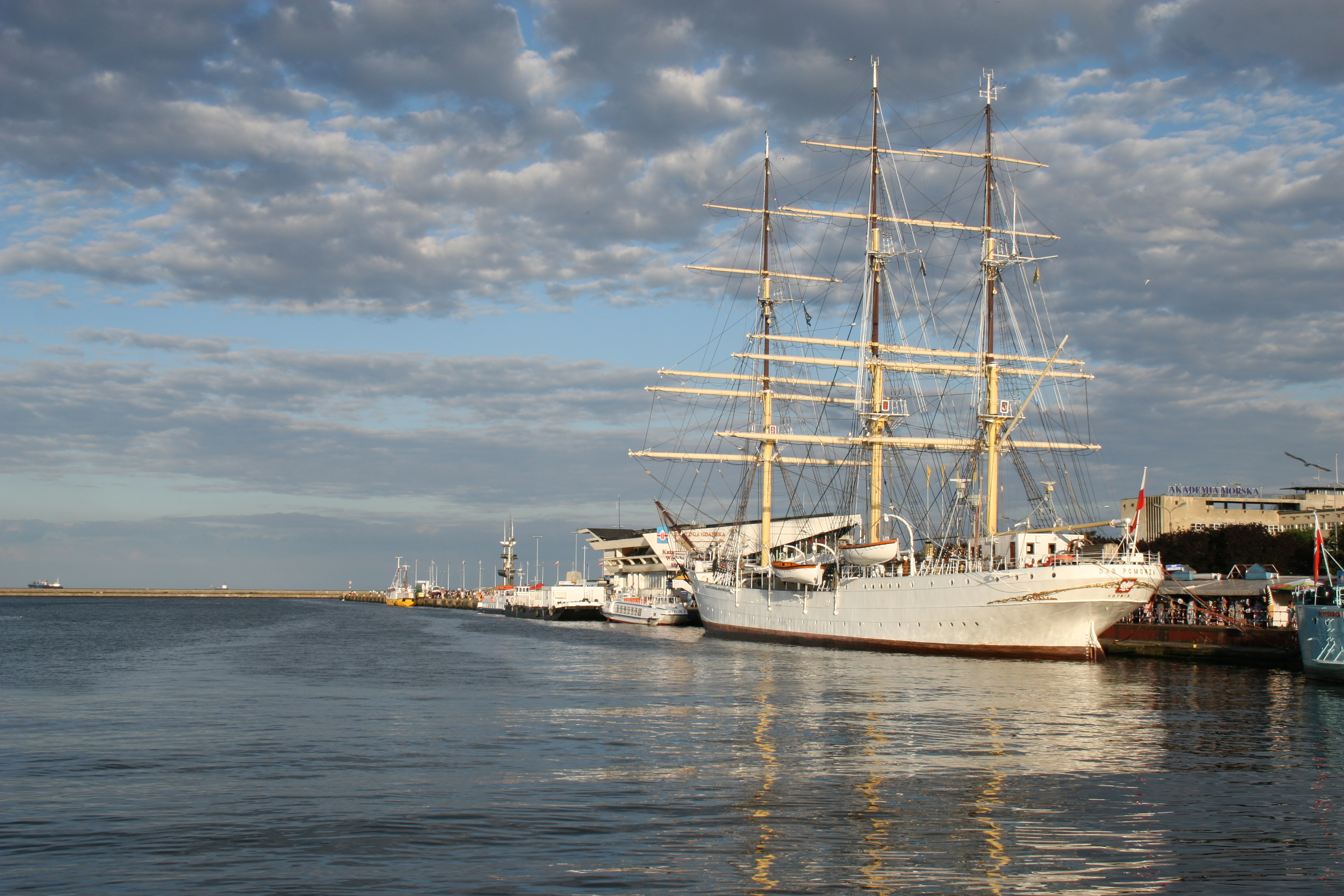
Day.

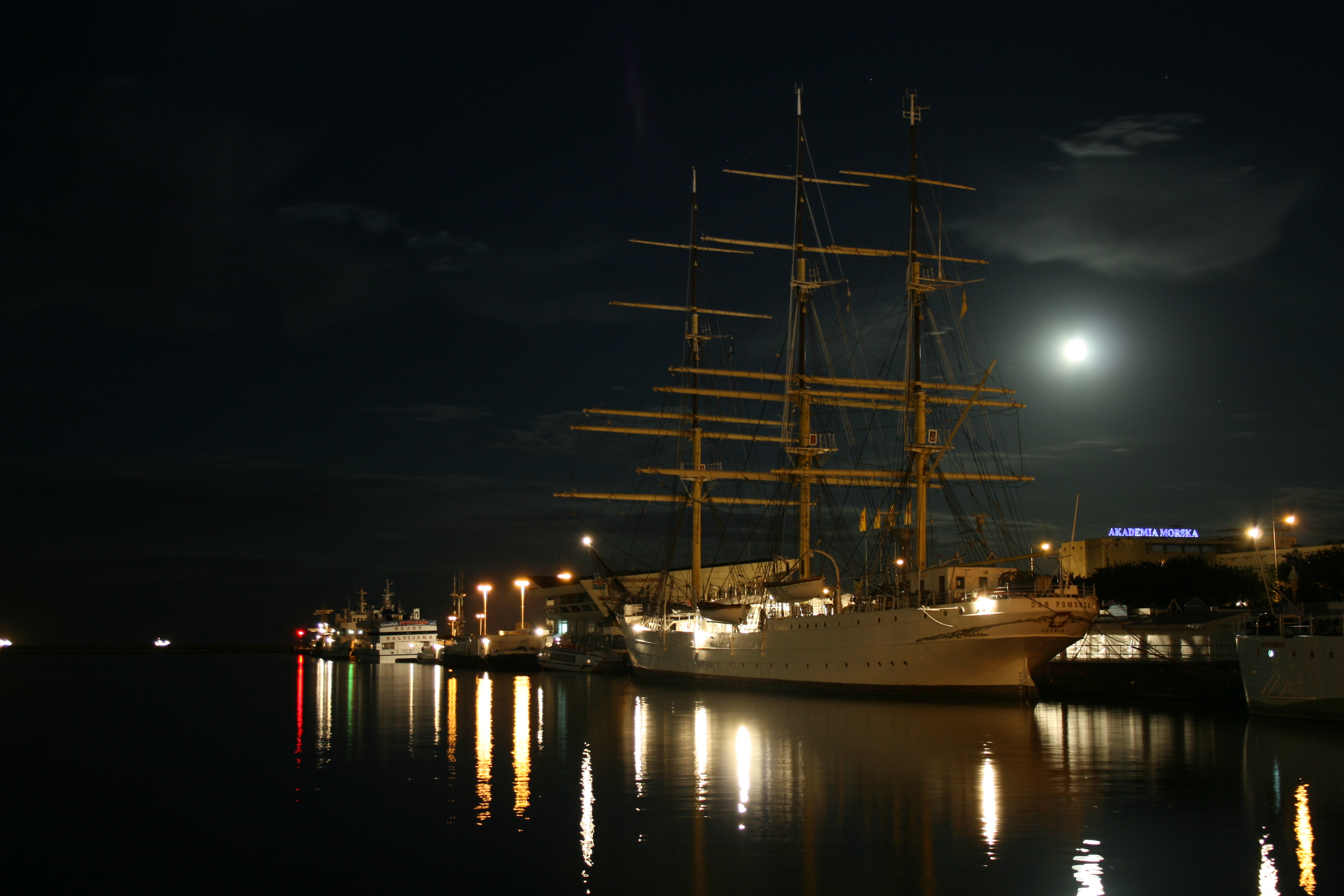
Night.

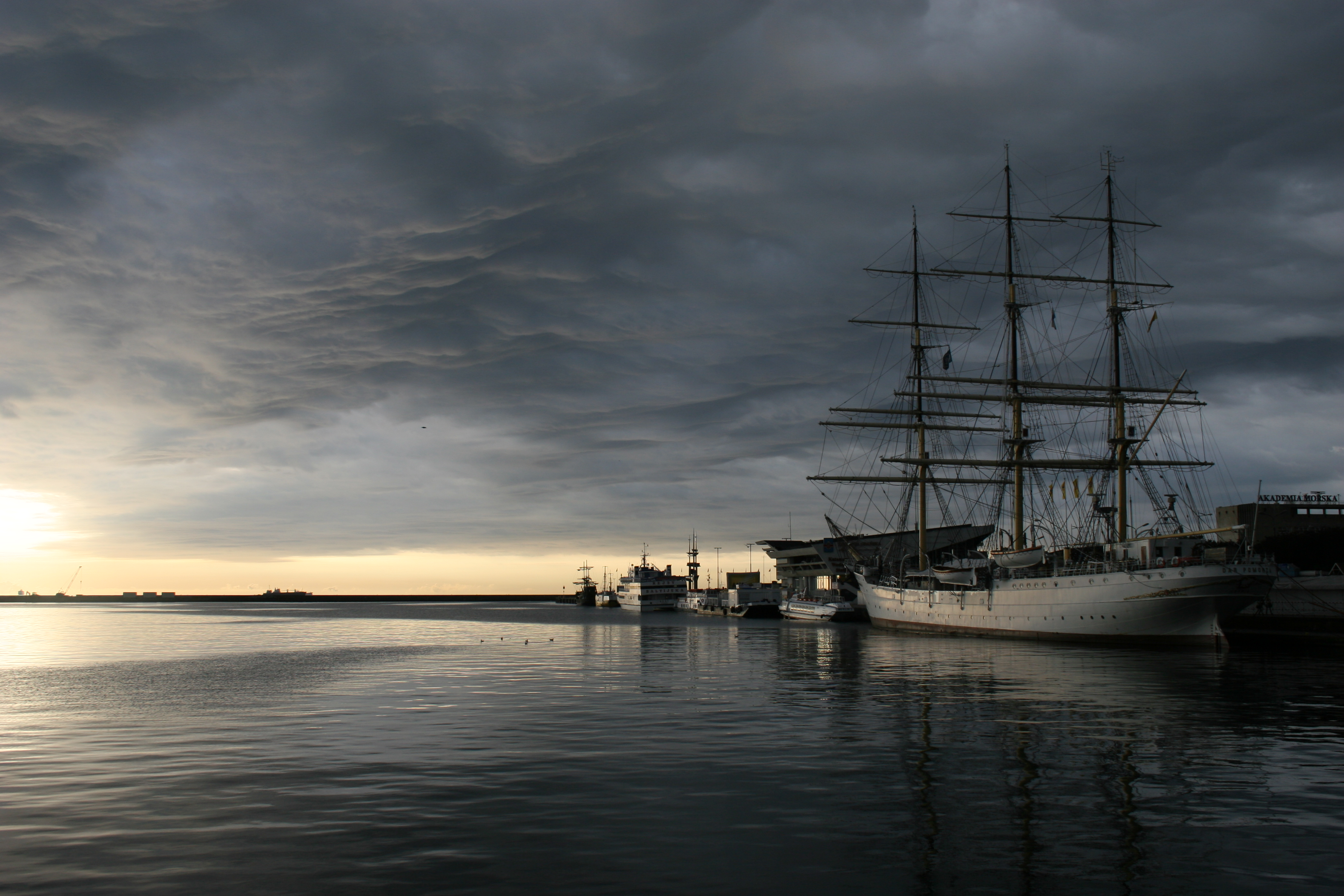

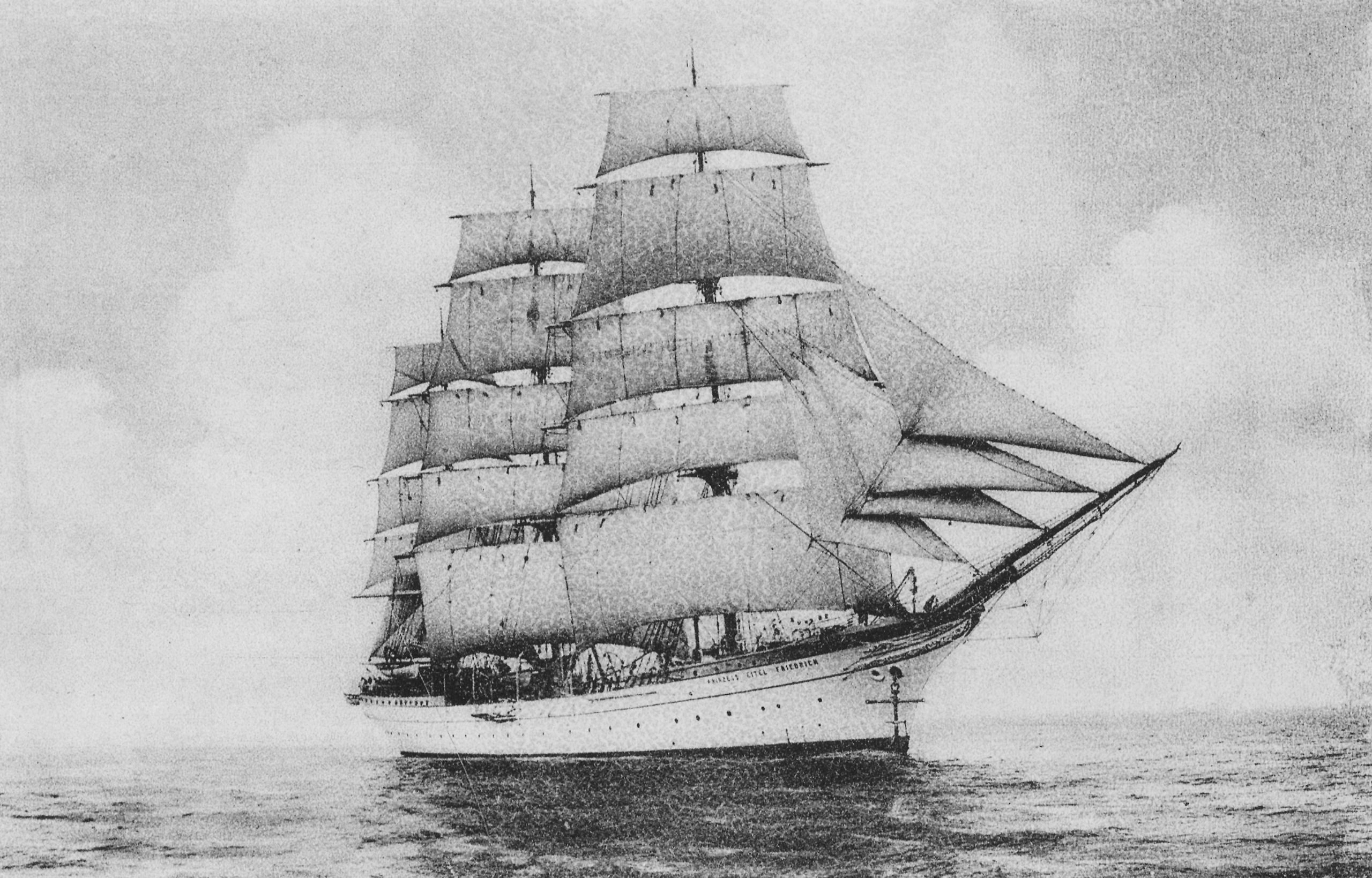
Dar Pomorza as Prinzeß Eitel Friedrich (photo from 1915).

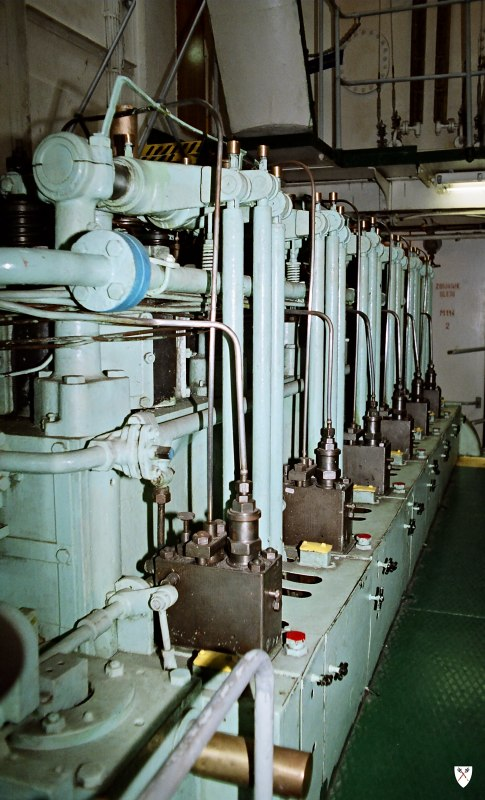
Main engine.

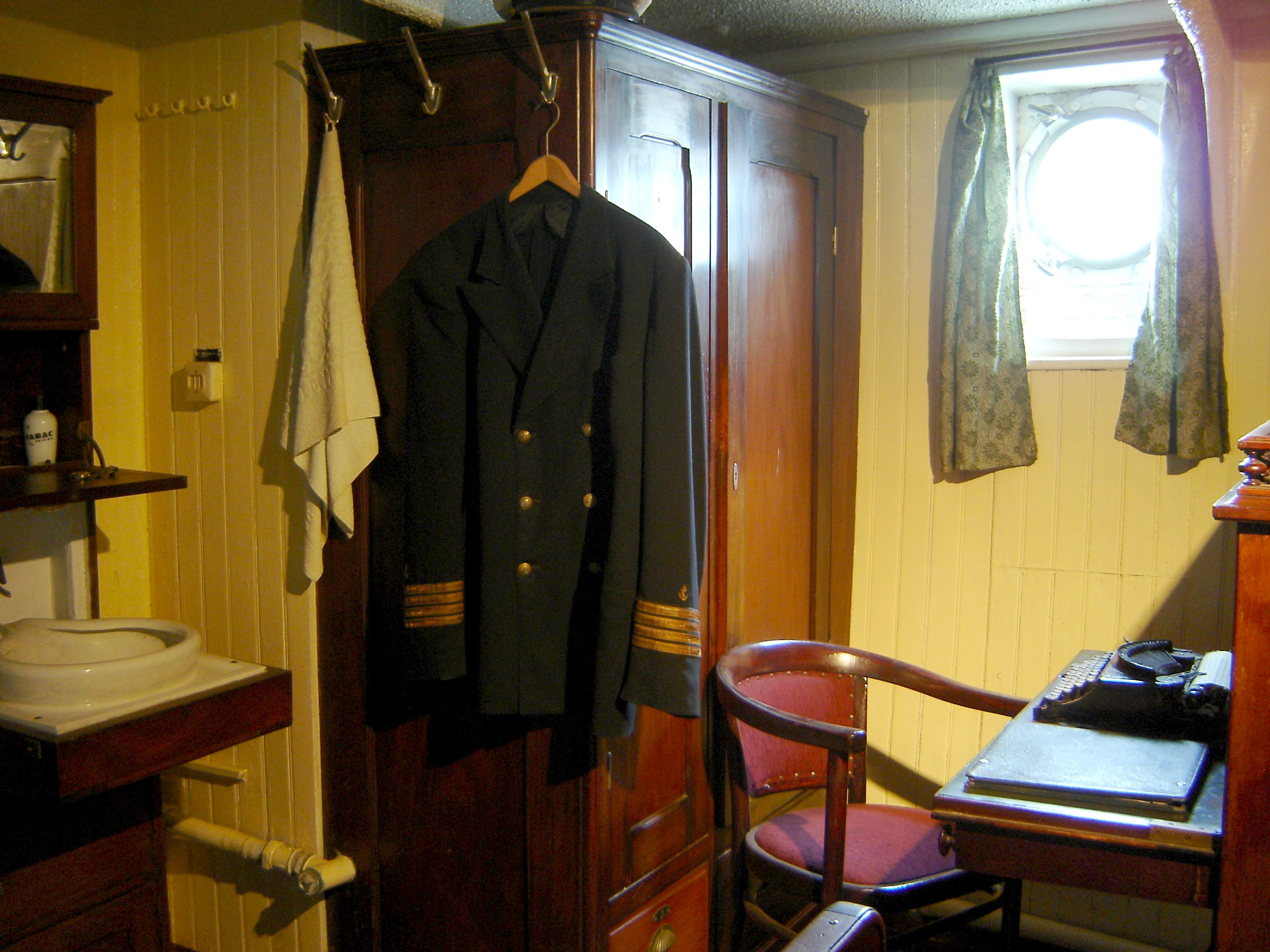
Officer quarters on board the ship. Uniform of Master mariner is visible.

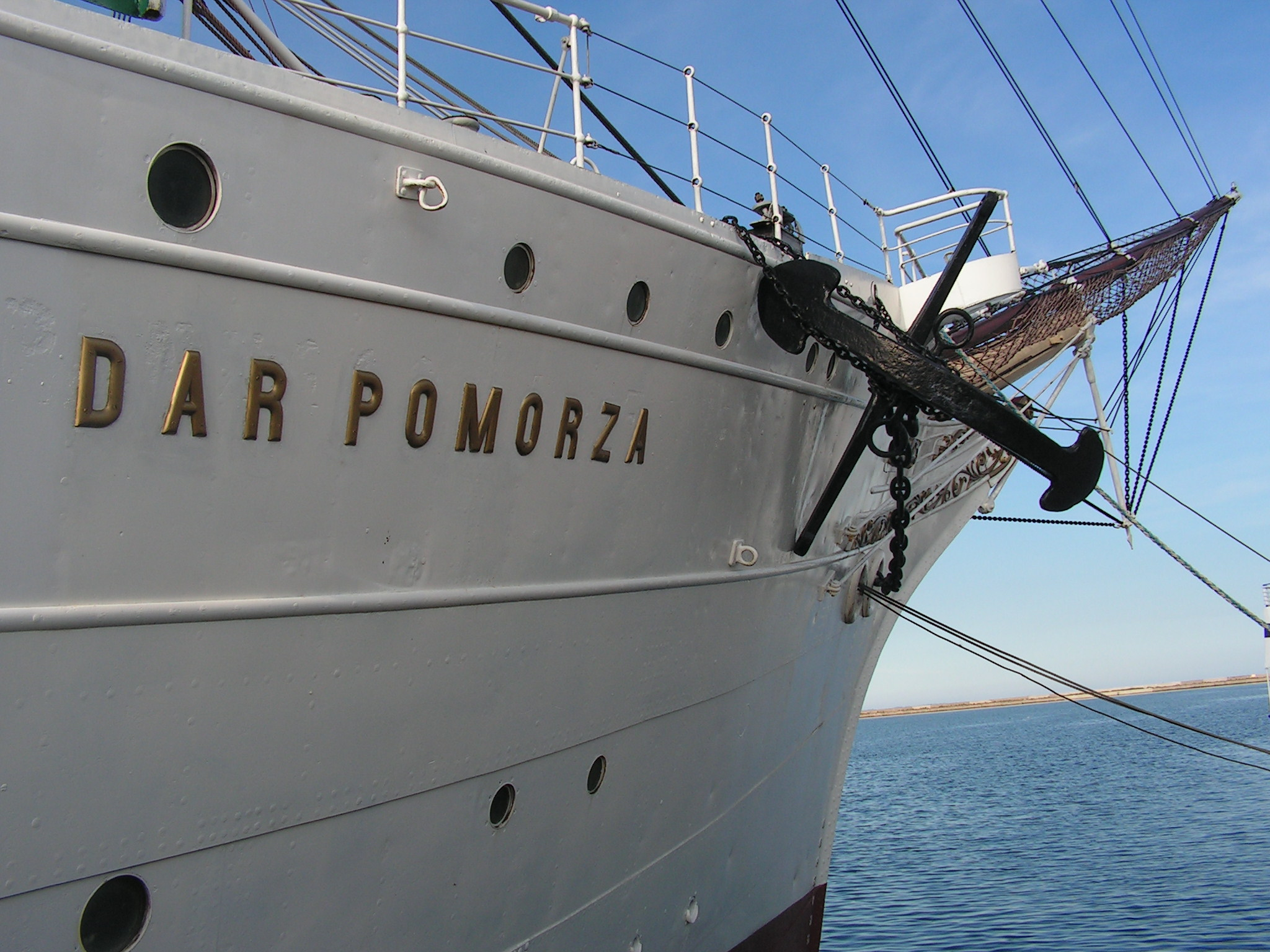

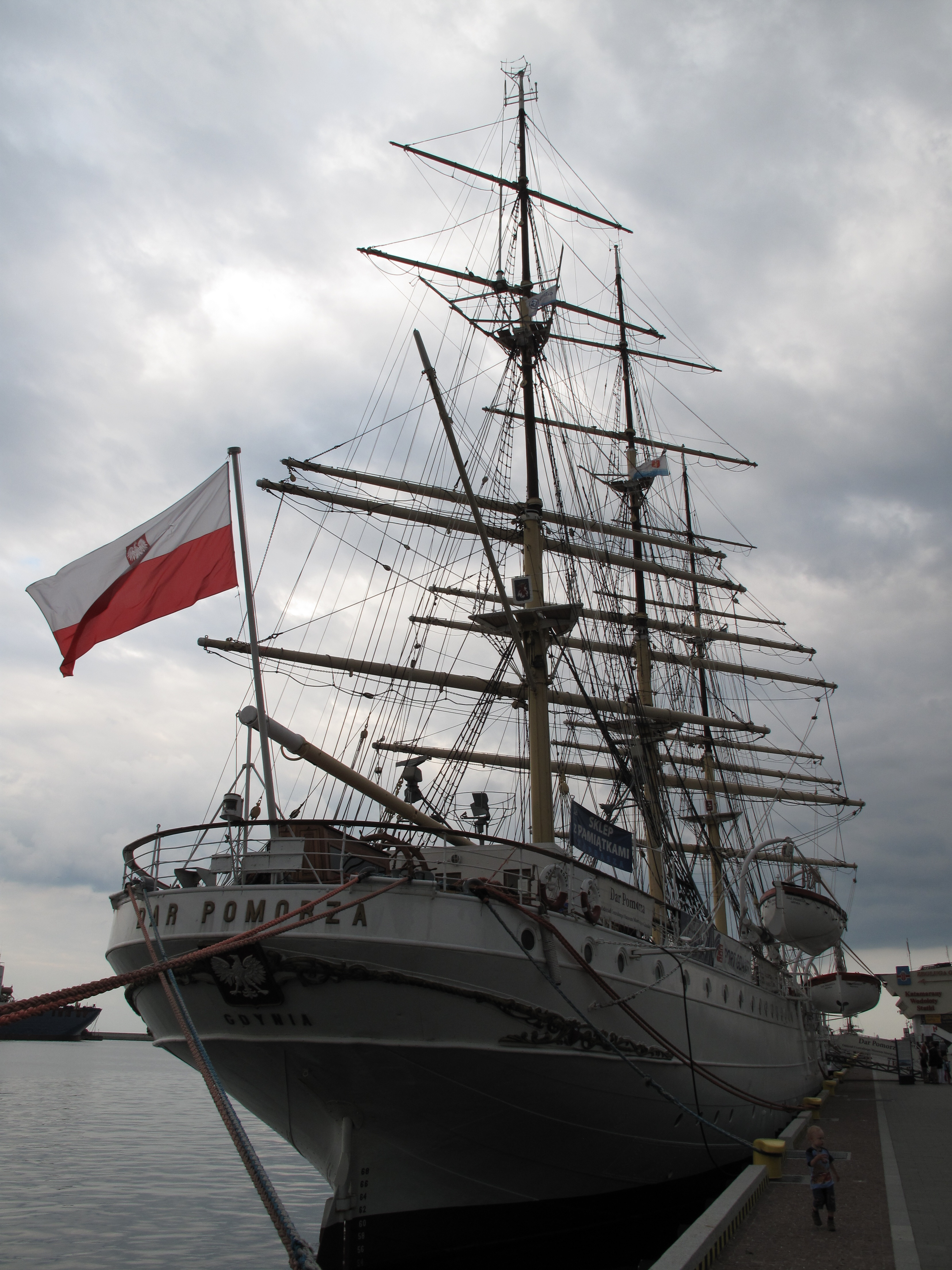

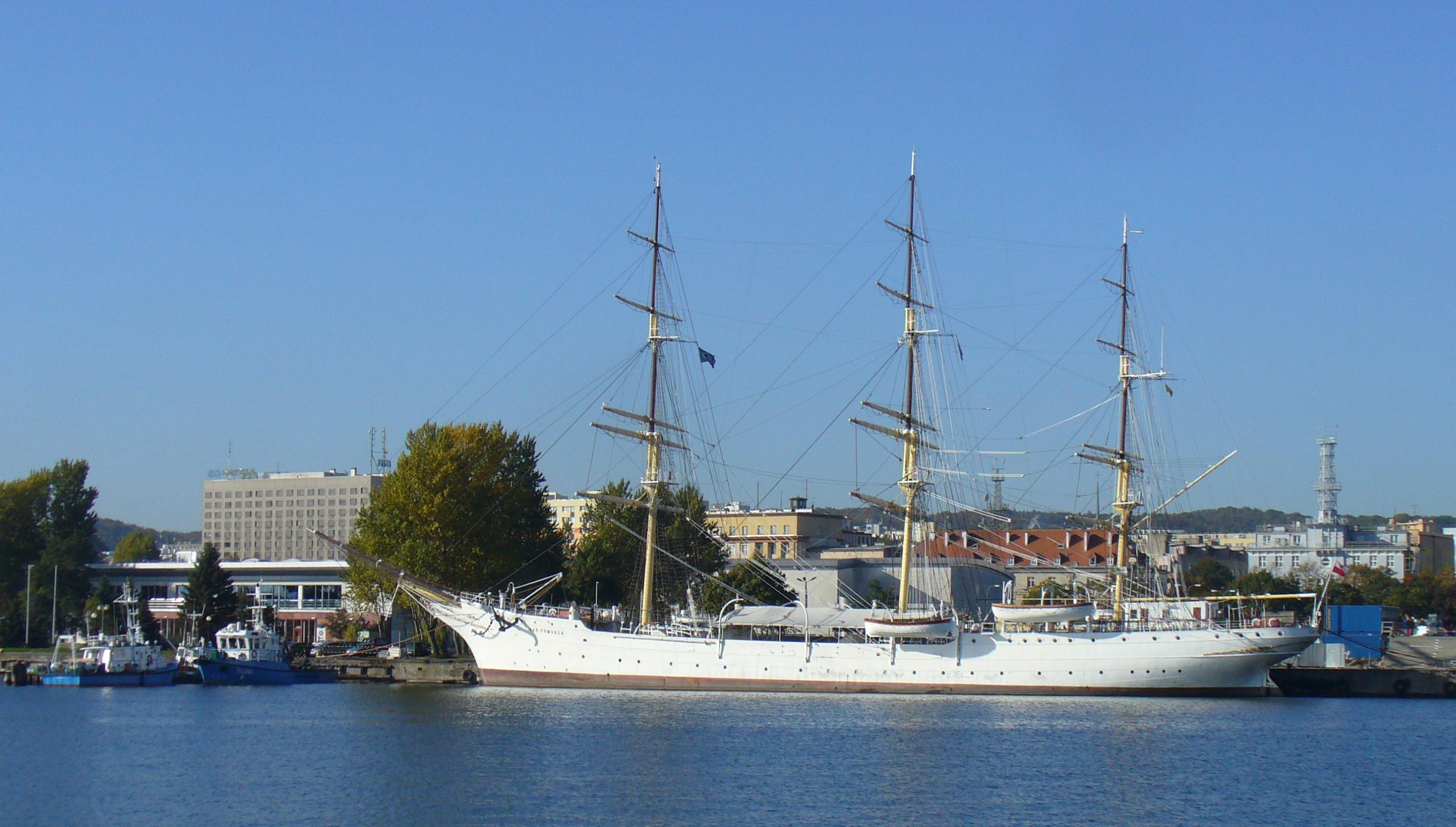

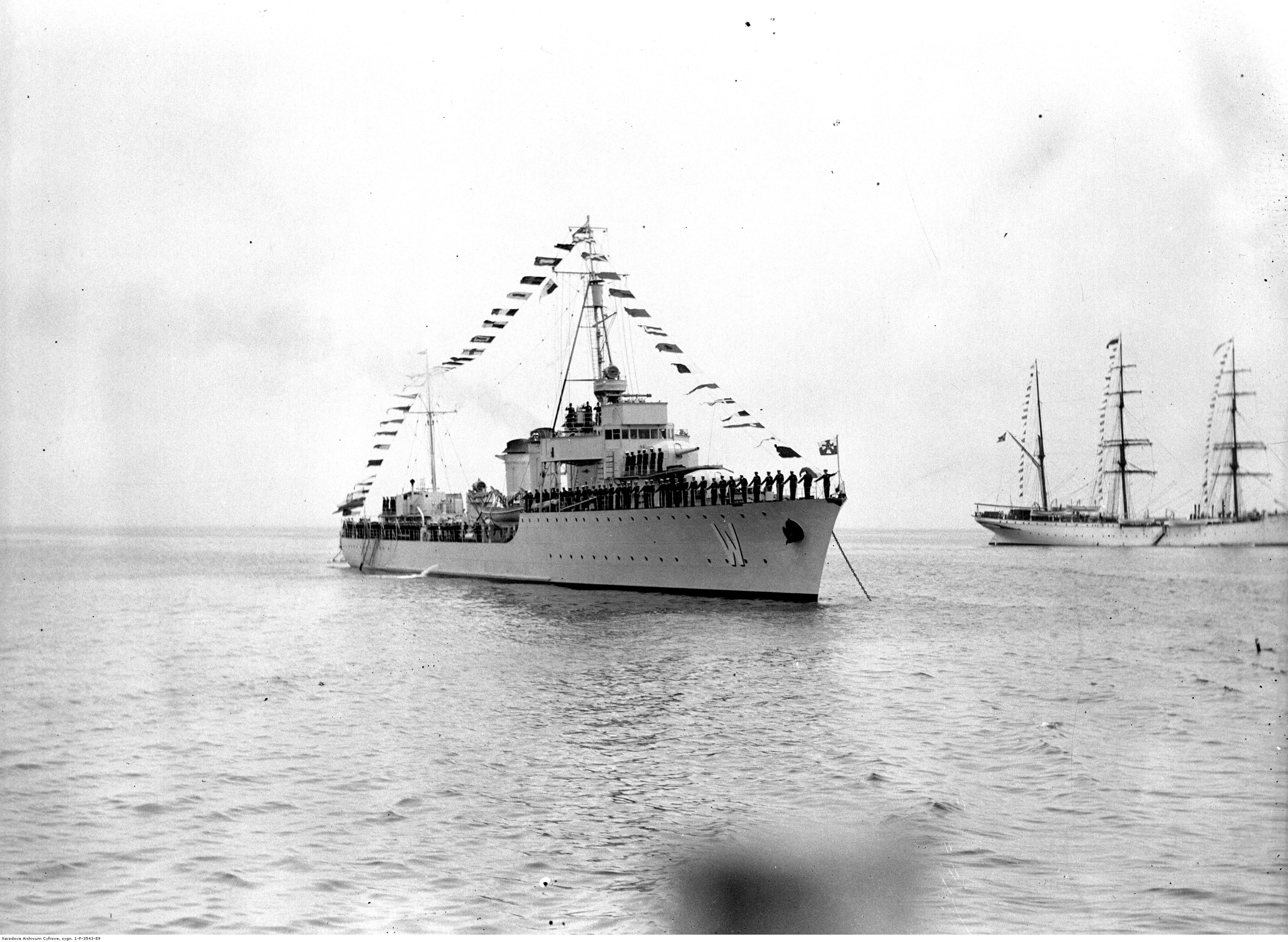
Wicher and Dar Pomorza.

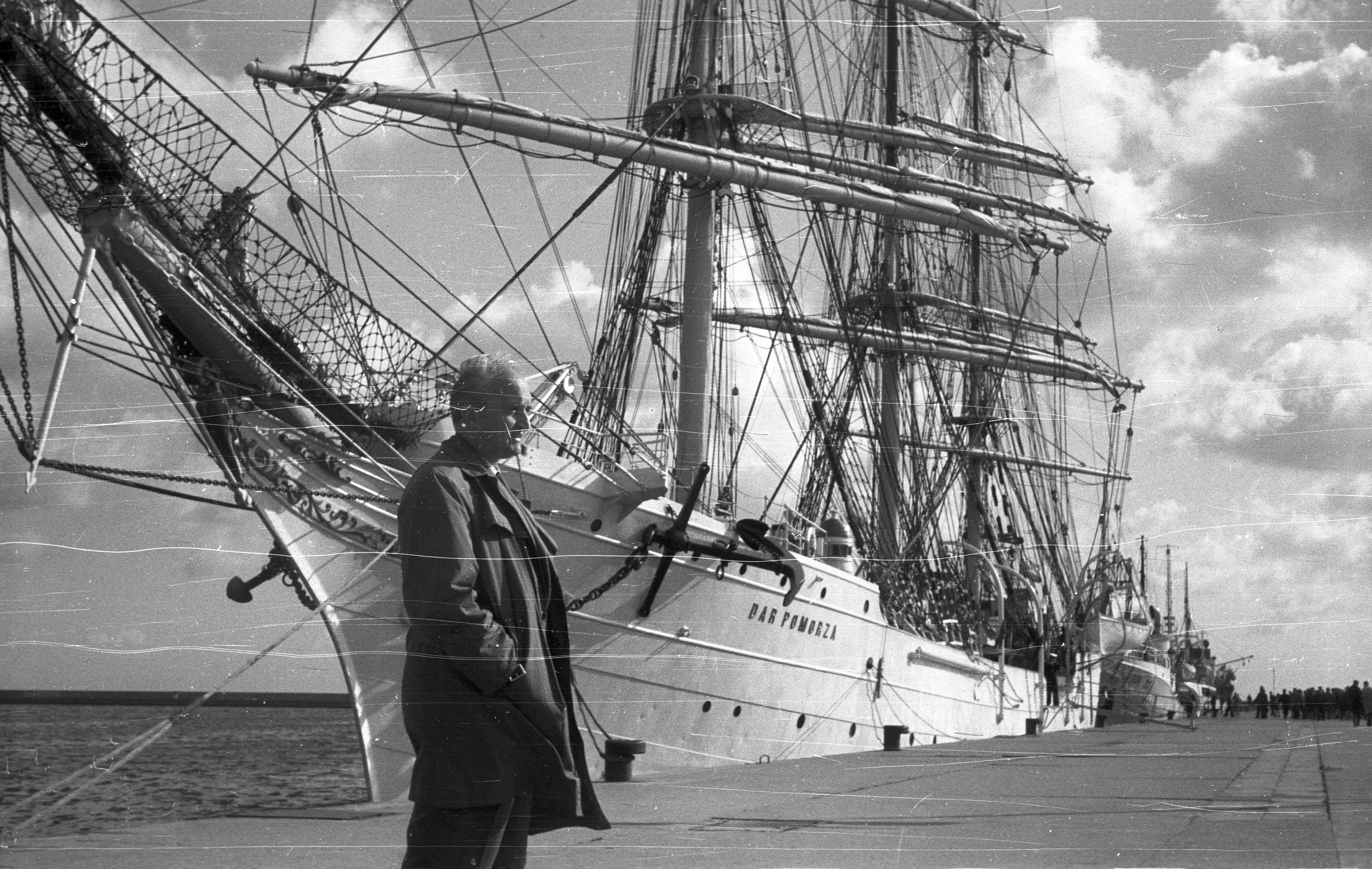
Dar Pomorza in 1962.

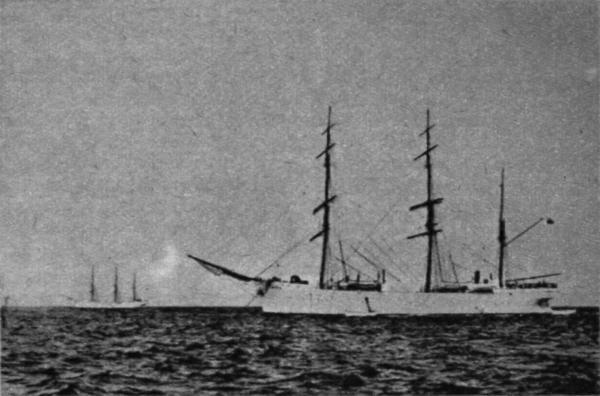
Dar Pomorza and Lwów.

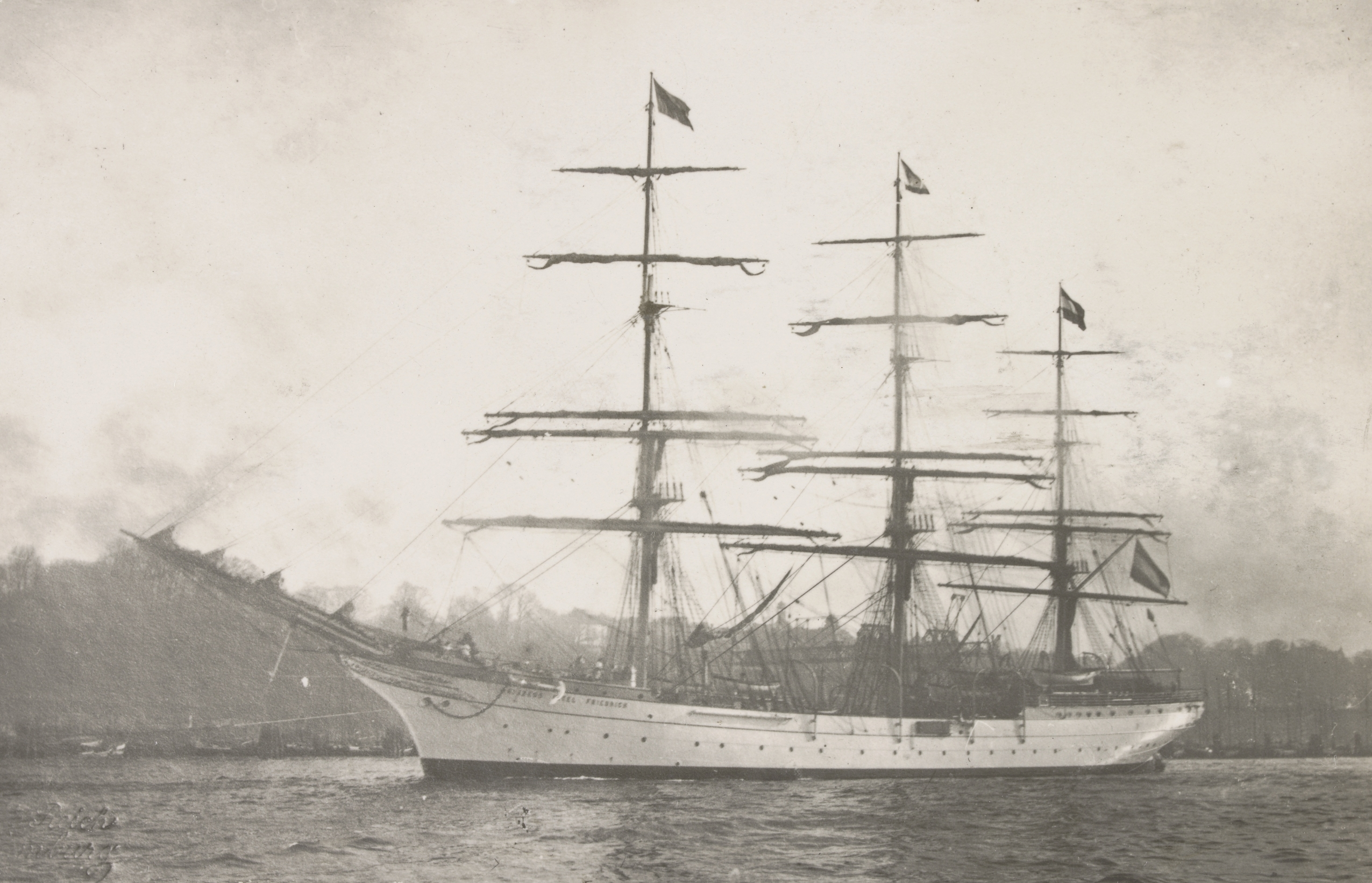
Prinzeß Eitel Friedrich.

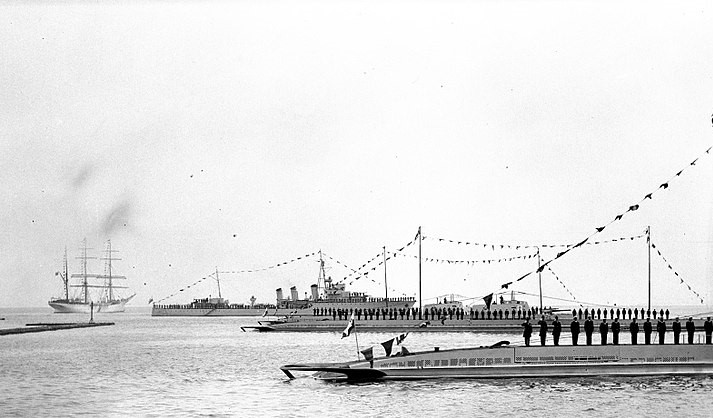
Wicher, Wilk, Ryś, and Żbik. Dar Pomorza visible in the background.

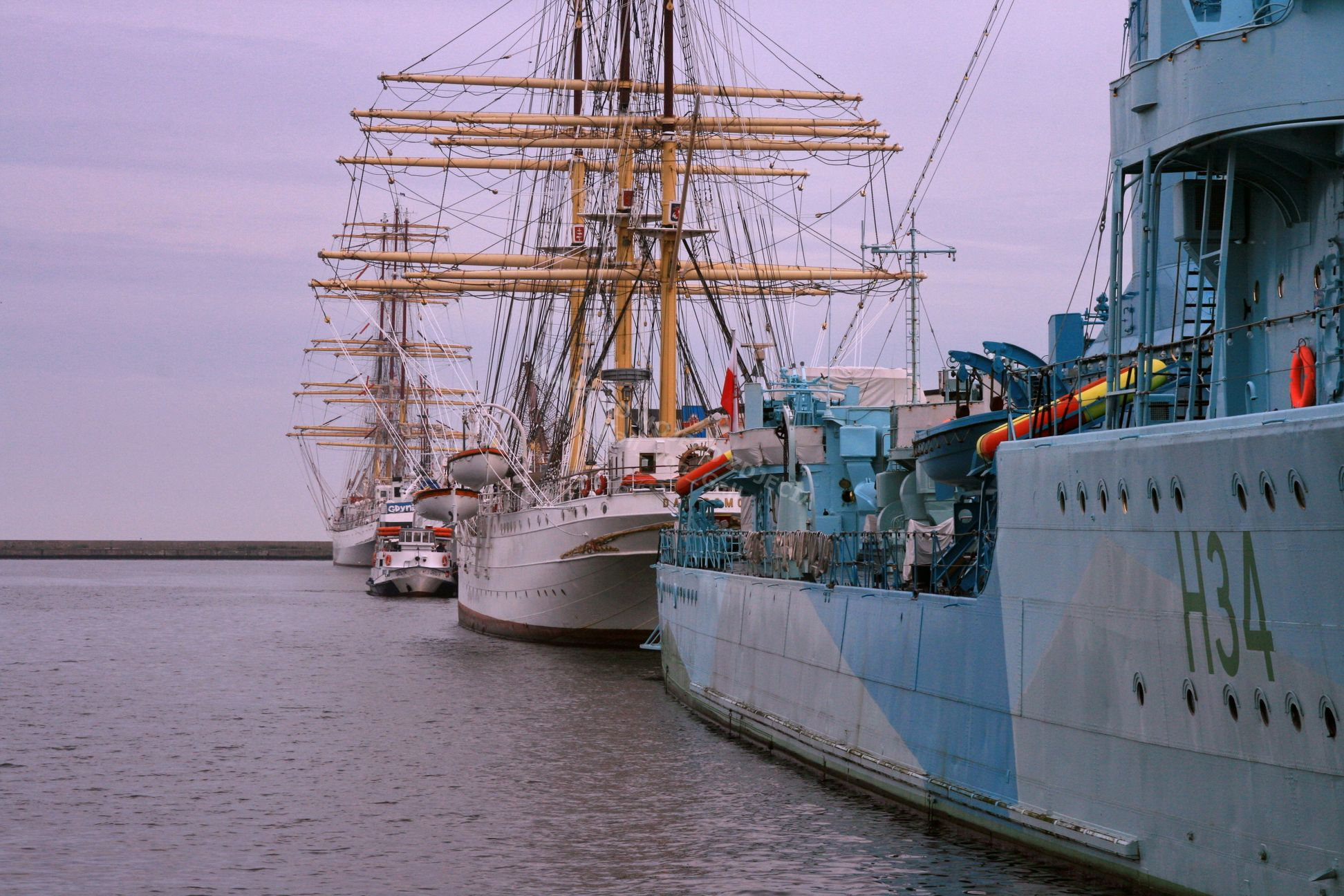
Dar Pomorza with Błyskawica visible.
