= SS Oceana (1887) =

Cargo and passenger ship sunk off Beachy Head after a collision

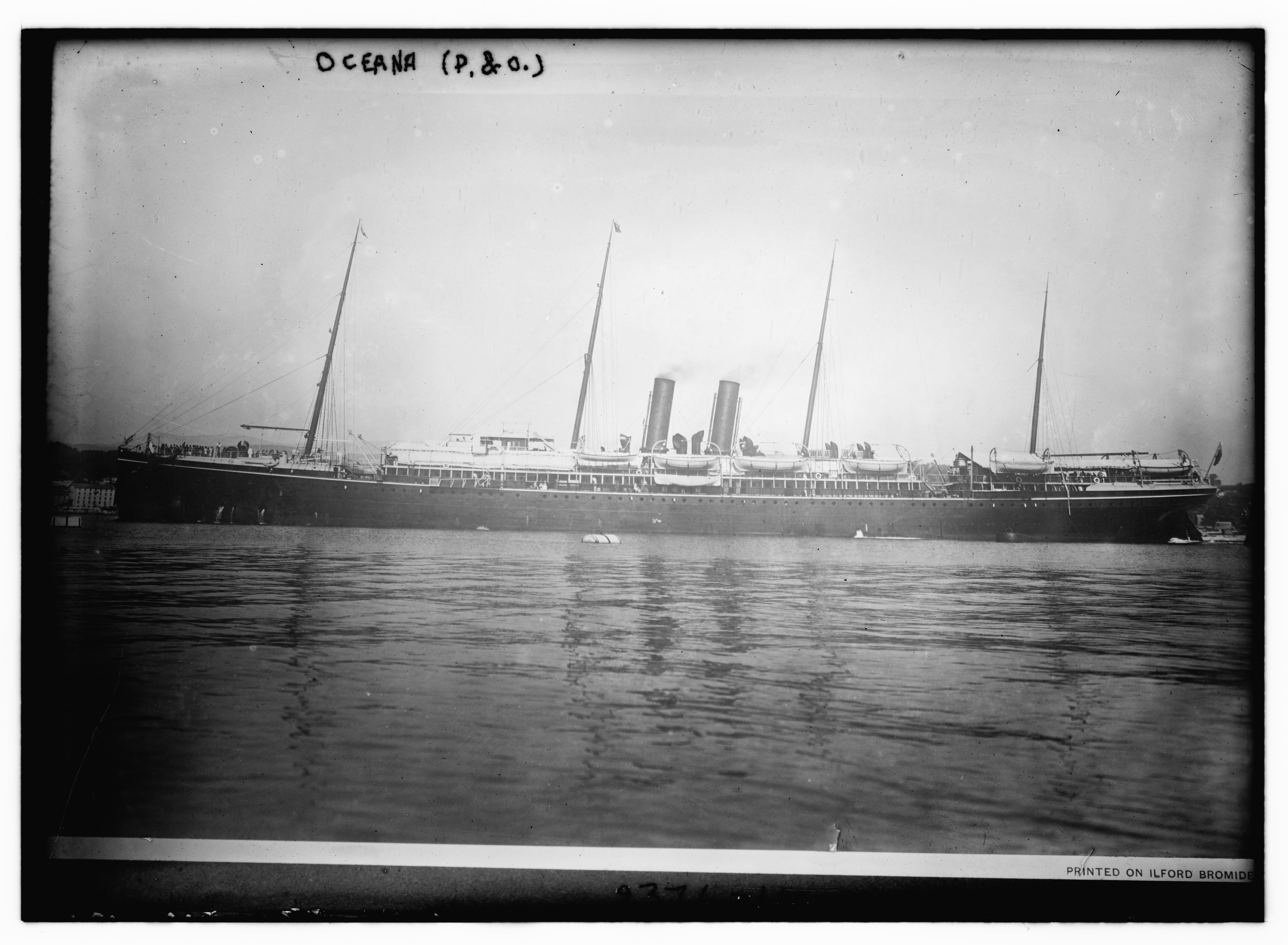
- Oceana

History
- Name: Oceana
- Owner: P&O
- Operator: P&O
- Port of registry: (United Kingdom) Belfast
- Route: London – Australia (1888–1905); London – India (1905–12)
- Builder: Harland & Wolff, Belfast
- Yard number: 201
- Launched: 17 September 1887
- Completed: 26 February 1888
- Maiden voyage: 19 March 1888
- In service: 19 March 1888 – 16 March 1912
- Identification: UK official number 93170; code letters KQJR
- Fate: Sunk in collision with Pisagua on 16 March 1912

General characteristics
- Type: Passenger liner/cargo vessel
- Tonnage: 6,610 GRT; 3,507 NRT; 5,173 LT DWT
- Length: 468.4 ft (142.8 m)
- Beam: 52.0 ft (15.8 m)
- Draught: 26 ft 6 1/2 in (8.090 m)
- Depth: 26.8 ft (8.2 m)
- Installed power: three-cylinder triple expansion steam engine, 7,000 ihp (5,200 kW)
- Propulsion: single screw
- Sail plan: four masts
- Speed: 16.5 knots (30.6 km/h; 19.0 mph)
- Capacity: Passengers: 250 first class, 159 second class; Cargo: 188,311 cu ft (5,332 m^{3})
- Notes: sister ship: Arcadia

SS Oceana was a P&O passenger liner and cargo vessel, launched in 1887 by Harland & Wolff of Belfast and completed in 1888. Originally assigned to carry passengers and mail between London and Australia, she was later assigned to routes between London and British India. On 16 March 1912 the ship collided in the Strait of Dover with the Pisagua, a 2,850 GRT German-registered four-masted steel-hulled barque. As a result Oceana sank off Beachy Head on the East Sussex coast, with the loss of 17 lives.

== Construction ==
Ordered by P&O from the Harland & Wolff shipyard in Belfast as Yard No. 201, the 6,610 GRT vessel was launched on 17 September 1887, and handed over from fitting out after running trials on 26 February 1888. The 468.4-foot (142.8 m) ship had a beam of 52.0 feet (15.8 m), four masts, two funnels and a single propeller. Her three-cylinder triple expansion steam engine produced 7,000 indicated horsepower (5,200 kW), giving her a top speed of 16.5 knots (30.6 km/h; 19.0 mph). She had accommodation for 250 first class passengers and 159 second class, and 4,000 mtons cargo capacity.

== Operations ==
Oceana made her maiden voyage from London on 19 March 1888, sailing to Melbourne and Sydney via Colombo, Ceylon. After upgrading and refitting in 1904, she began her last voyage on this passage on 12 May 1905, after which she was placed on the London to Bombay route.

On 13 June 1894, former Premier of South Australia, Sir John Bray died onboard during his return to Adelaide from London following the completion of his term as South Australia's Agent General.

Author Mark Twain traveled from Sydney to Ceylon aboard Oceana in 1895 as part of his travels described in Following the Equator. He remarked of the ship:

This Oceana is a stately big ship, luxuriously appointed. She has spacious promenade decks. Large rooms; a surpassingly comfortable ship. The officers' library is well selected; a ship's library is not usually that . . . . For meals, the bugle call, man-of-war fashion; a pleasant change from the terrible gong.

== Sinking ==
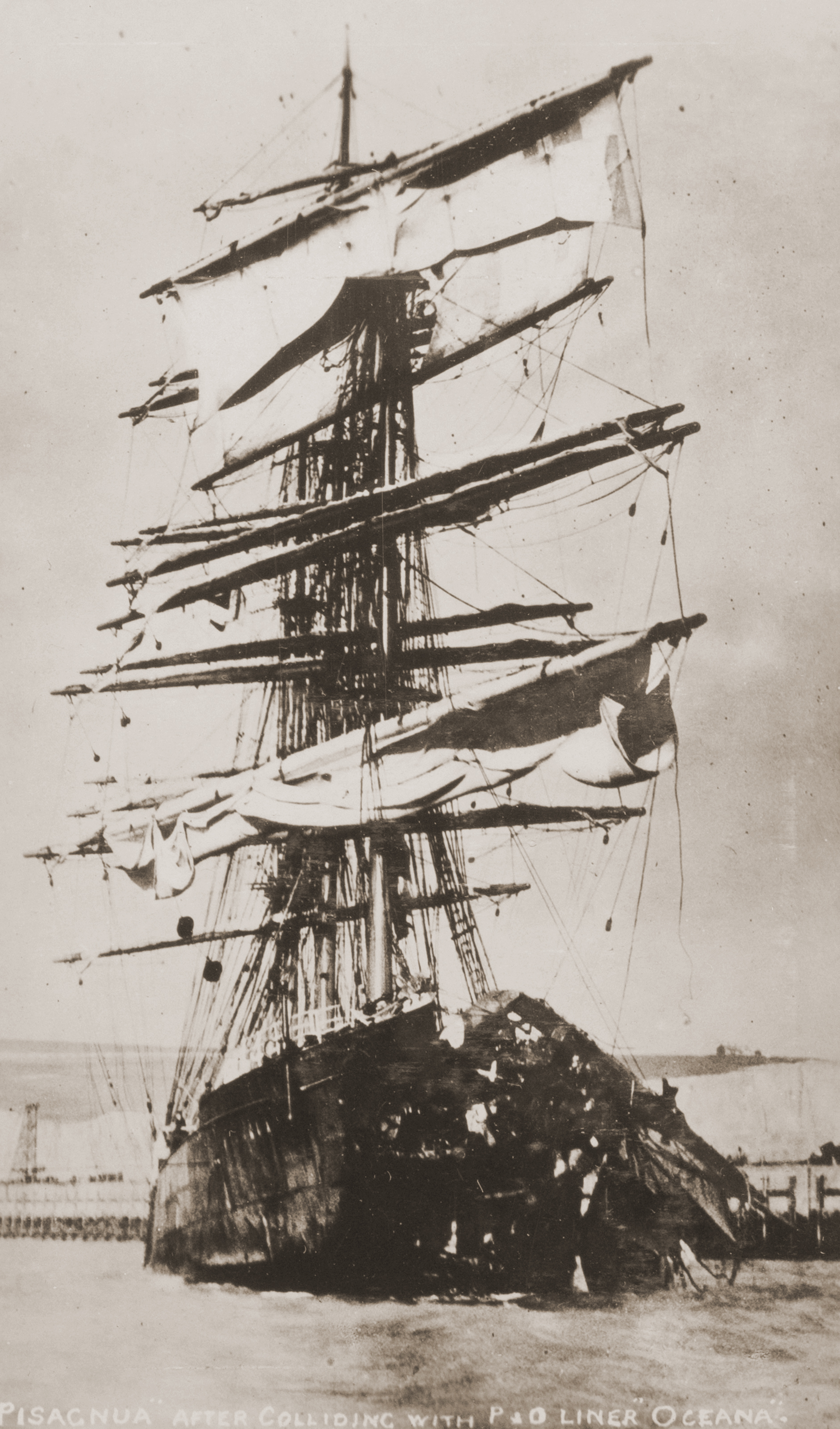
Pisagua after the collision with Oceana

On 15 March 1912 Oceana finished loading for her next trip to Bombay in the Port of Tilbury, under the command of Captain Thomas H. Hyde, RNR. Aboard were 41 passengers, a complement of 220 crew and a pilot. She was also carrying £747,110 worth of gold and silver ingots: £3 million at 2010 values.

The next day she was proceeding west through the Strait of Dover at nearly full speed. The sea was calm although there was a strong headwind. In the opposite direction approached the Pisagua, a 2,850-ton German-registered four-masted steel-hulled barque. Commissioned, owned and operated by F. Laeisz of Hamburg, she was on her way from Mejillones, Chile to Hamburg with a cargo of nitrate, sailing under full sail at a speed of almost 20 knots (37 km/h).

The two ships sighted each other when they were about a 1/2 nautical mile (1 km) apart. The captain of Pisagua burnt a warning flare, which was seen by the crew and senior officer on duty on the bridge of Oceana, who then gave the order to turn to port. The pilot from Tilbury and for the Strait of Dover, Mr Penny, who was board Oceana in the charthouse, came to the bridge and realized that this manoeuvre would not be enough to avert a collision. He called "hard to port", but before Oceana could get out of the course, Pisagua struck Oceana amidships, making a 40-foot (12 m) gash in her side. The collision was 4 nautical miles (7.4 km; 4.6 mi) off of Beachy Head.

The pilot ordered the immediate closure of all the watertight bulkhead doors on Oceana, whilst the captain ordered all crew and passengers to their boat stations to stand by to abandon ship. Sending out an immediate distress signal, the London, Brighton & South Coast Railway passenger ferry Sussex attended the scene, while two other paddle steamers and RMS Ruahine stood by. While awaiting rescue, the crew tried to lower one of the lifeboats, but it crashed into the sea and capsized, resulting in the loss of seven passengers and ten crew. Sussex managed to take on board 241 of the remaining passengers and crew.

Although listing, Oceana was taken in tow by the Newhaven tug Alert, stern first, at 08:00. But by 10:00 she had developed an adverse list, enough to raise her propeller out of the water. Captain Hyde and the crew who had stayed aboard to help the tow now abandoned ship to the Alert, and watched from the tug as she sank in less than 20 minutes. Oceana sank close to the seaside resort town of Eastbourne in shallow water, settling on the sea bed with her masts and the tops of her funnels showing out of the sea at low tide.

Pisagua drifted off leeward after the collision, but managed to survive with severe damage to the bow and foremast. Towed to Dover for immediate sea-going repairs, she was then towed to Hamburg where she was condemned. She was rebuilt as a whale factory ship and operated by Søren L. Christensen,. On 12 February 1913, Pisagua was stranded at Low Island, South Shetland Islands. Although insured for NOK 318,000, she was subsequently condemned and written off at a loss to her owners.

After the sinking, P&O sued Laeisz, claiming damages for the loss of Oceana. Judgement was given that Pisagua was not at fault, due to a combination of factors, including that Oceana was obliged to give way to Pisagua under the "steam gives way to sail" rule. The subsequent Board of Trade Inquiry, which reported on 13 July 1912, reached similar conclusions, suspended the chief officer's certificate of competency for six months and censured the master.

== Bullion salvage ==
The day after the collision and ship's sinking, P&O agreed with the insurers' salvage team to send divers to recover the gold and silver ingots. Divers initially entered the Captain's cabin and opened his safe, to recover the keys to the ship's five strongrooms. This enabled them to open three of the five strongrooms, while the other two were opened with a lump hammer and cold chisel. The salvage operation lasted ten days. A notable history item of the day, the salvage operation was filmed by the Natural Color Kinematograph Company, using the "Kinemacolor" system, the first successful colour motion picture process.

== Wreck ==
In July 1912 the Royal Navy blew up the wreck as it posed a danger to shipping.

Oceana is today a popular wreck diving site. 15 nautical miles (28 km) east from Newhaven at 50°42.32′N 00°25.75′E, at low tide the wreck lies in less than 24 metres (79 ft) of water, upright and standing 10 metres (33 ft) above the sea bed. Resting on an even keel on a gravel seabed, the bows are upright and mostly intact. Her superstructure has collapsed, but her sides are vertical and complete with portholes. Divers can see inside the engine room from above to see the four boilers and the 10-metre-high (33 ft) 7,000 ihp triple-expansion steam engine. Being close to the shore, the wreck attracts a large amount of sea life.

Divers have found single gold and silver ingots since, the last being recovered in 1996. The ship was carrying a memorial plaque to 800 men of the 1st Nottingham Regiment who had died in India from 1819 to 1838, mainly from local diseases. The plaque was recovered by divers Geoff and Jamie Smith from the Tunbridge Wells Sub-Aqua Club in August 2009, and after restoration and preservation presented to 2nd Battalion the Mercian Regiment in October 2009. It is currently displayed in the regimental museum in Nottingham Castle.

== See also ==
- MV Queen of the Oceans, formerly Oceana
