= Pisagua (ship) =

Coordinates: 63°17′S 62°09′W

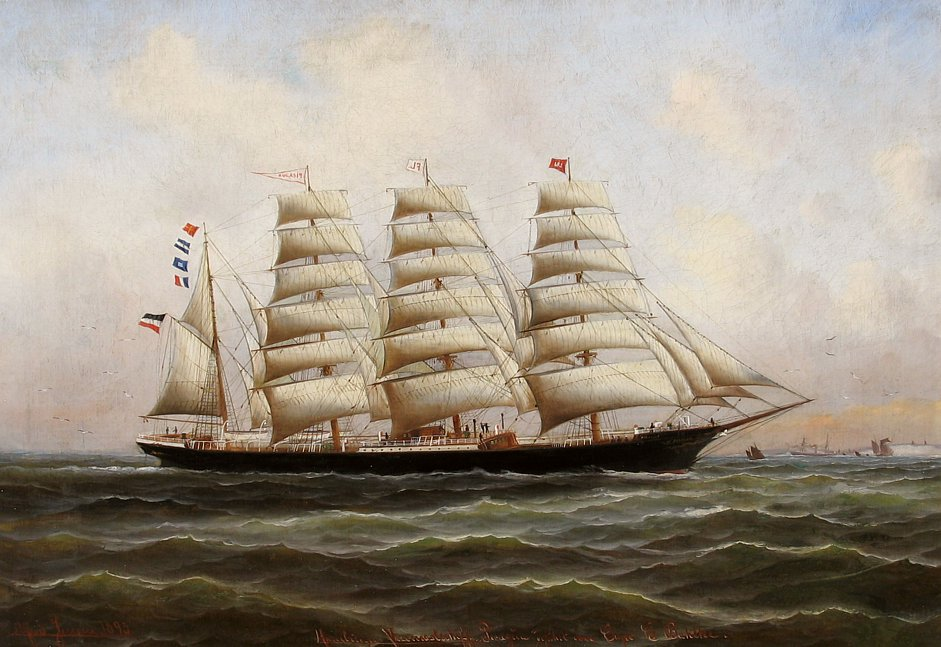
- Pisagua in 1893

History
- Name: Pisagua
- Owner: F. Laeisz, Hamburg (1892–1912); A/S Ørnen (1912–13)
- Operator: F. Laeisz, Hamburg (1892–1912); Søren L. Christensen (1912–13)
- Port of registry: (German Empire) Hamburg (1892–1912); (Norway) Sandefjord (1912–13)
- Builder: Joh. C. Tecklenborg, Geestemünde
- Yard number: 115
- Launched: 23 September 1892
- In service: 1892
- Identification: code letters RJPT
- Fate: Stranded 13 February 1913

General characteristics
- Tonnage: 2,906 GRT; 2,763 NRT
- Length: 113.00 m (370 ft 9 in) overall; 95.70 m (314 ft 0 in) between perpendiculars
- Beam: 13.58 m (44 ft 7 in)
- Height: 52.50 m (172 ft 3 in) (tallest mast height over waterline)
- Depth: 7.94 m (26 ft 1 in)
- Propulsion: 3,500 m^{2} (38,000 sq ft) sails
- Sail plan: Barque
- Notes: sister ship: Placilla

Pisagua was a four-masted barque that was built for F. Laeisz, Hamburg, Germany in 1892 and served for twenty years, surviving a collision with Oceana in 1912. She was repaired and sold to a Norwegian owner, only to be stranded in the South Shetland Islands the following year.

== Description ==
Joh. C. Tecklenborg of Geestemünde built Pisagua as yard number 115. Pisagua was 113.00 metres (370 ft 9 in) long overall, with a beam of 13.58 metres (44 ft 7 in) and a depth of 7.94 metres (26 ft 1 in). She had four masts and was rigged as a barque, with royal sails over double top and topgallant sails. Her air draught was 52.50 metres (172 ft 3 in). Her sail area was 3,500 square metres (38,000 sq ft). Pisagua was a sister ship to Placilla, which had been launched seven months earlier. Pisagua's code letters were RJPT.

== History ==
Pisagua was launched on 23 September 1892. In that year she sailed to Valparaíso, Chile. Her voyage from Lizard Point to Valparaíso taking 71 days. In 1893 she made the voyage from Iquique, Chile to Lizard Point in 74 days. She sailed between Germany and Chile until 1896 when she made the voyage from Lizard Point to Calcutta, India in 99 days. In 1897, she sailed from Calcutta to Boston, United States in 111 days. She then sailed from Philadelphia to Hiogo, Japan in 131 days, the voyage from there to Iquique took 72 days.

In 1901, Pisagua sailed from Lizard Point to Port Pirie, Australia in 79 days, and from there to Taltal, Chile in a further 32 days. In 1904, she was again employed on the route to Chile, sailing from the Elbe river in Germany to Valparaíso in 87 days. Further voyages were made to Chile in 1907 and 1908.

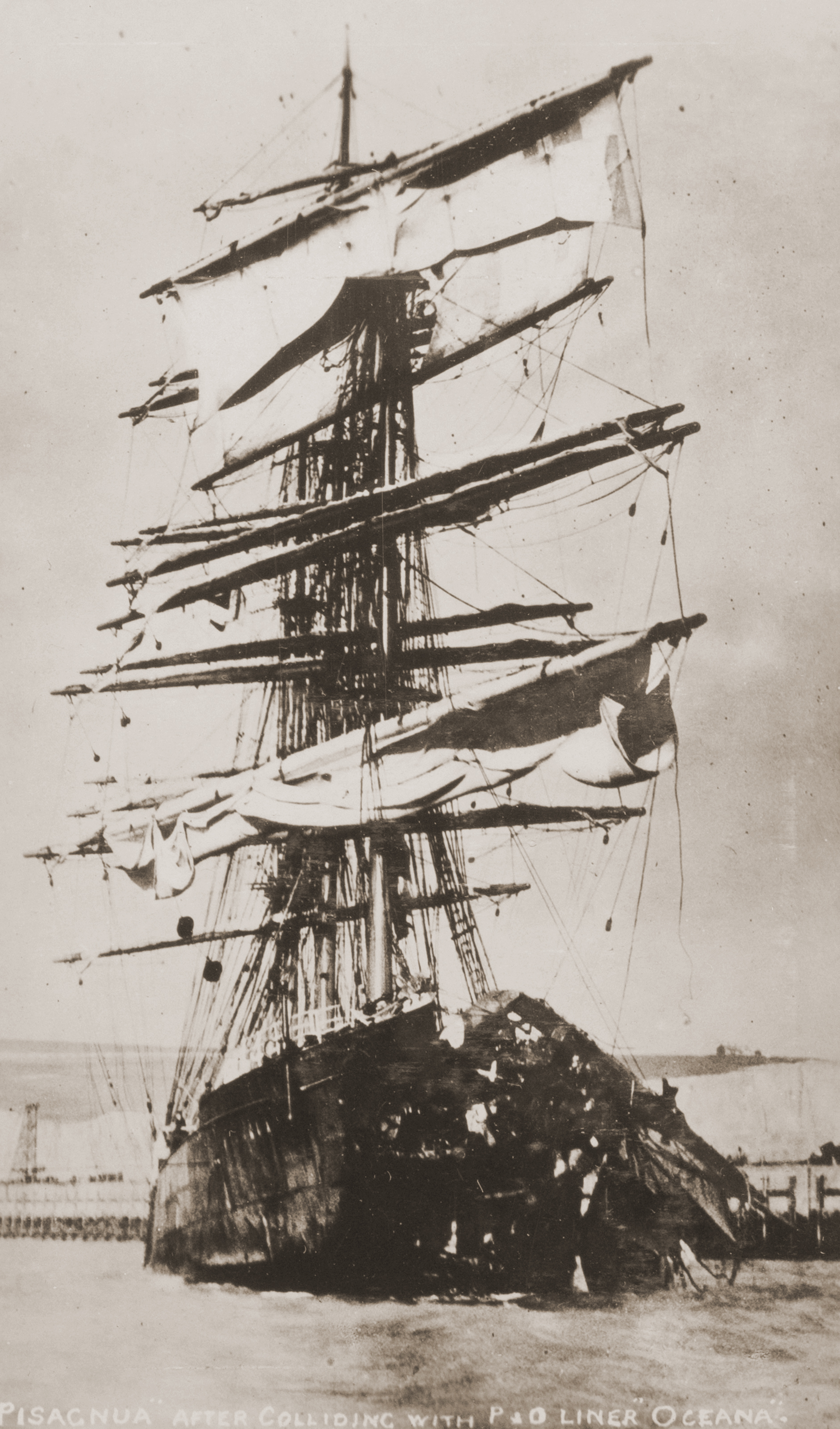
Pisagua after the collision with Oceana

On 12 March 1912, Pisagua was involved in a collision with the P&O steamship Oceana off Beachy Head, East Sussex. Pisagua hit Oceana amidships, creating a 40 feet (12 m) long gash in her side. Nine people died when one of Oceana's lifeboats capsized, but the other 241 passengers and crew were rescued. Oceana sank but Pisagua survived with severe damage to the bow and foremast.

P&O sued Laeisz, claiming damages for the loss of Oceana. Judgement was given that Pisagua was not at fault, due to a combination of factors, including that the obligation was on Oceana to give way to Pisagua under the "steam gives way to sail" rule.

Pisagua was towed to Dover, Kent for repairs. Pisagua was then towed to Hamburg where she was condemned. In October 1912, she was sold to A/S Ørnen, Sandefjord, Norway for £5,000. Pisagua was rebuilt as a whale factory. She was operated by Søren L. Christensen. On 12 February 1913, Pisagua was stranded at Low Island, South Shetland Islands. Although she was insured for NOK 318,000, her owners made a loss of NOK 54,713 on the ship.

== Captains ==
The captains of Pisagua were:-

- J Früdden (1892–93)
- C E F J Bahlke (1893–1901)
- Hinrich Nissen (1901–03)
- H A Dehnhardt (1904–08)
- J Frömcke (1909)
- R Dahm (1910–12)
- Larsen (1912–13)
