= Kristofer Lehmkuhl =

Norwegian politician

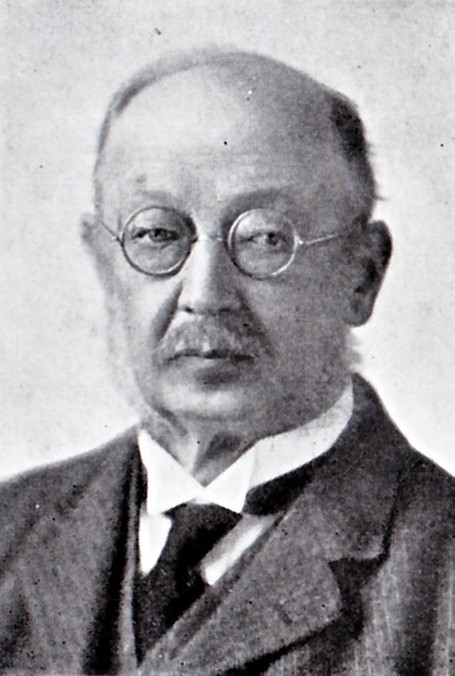
Kristofer Lehmkuhl

Kristofer Diedrich Lehmkuhl (25 September 1855 – 23 October 1949) was a Norwegian politician from Bergen. He was elected to the Parliament of Norway in 1903 and became the Minister of Labour in 1905 and from 1905 to 1907. He did not seek reelection in 1906.

He gave name to the three-masted barque rigged sail vessel Statsraad Lehmkuhl.
