= Placilla (ship) =

Coordinates: 52°48′46″N 1°48′21″E

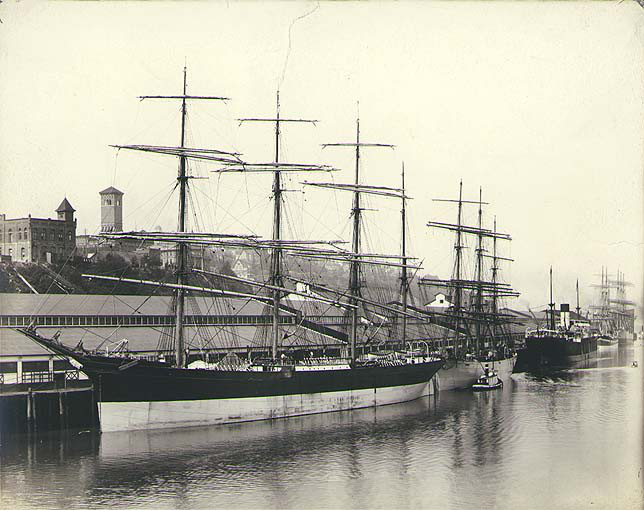
- 4 masts

History

German Empire
- Name: Placilla (1892-1903); Optima (1903-05)
- Owner: F. Laeisz, Hamburg (1892-1901); Rhederi AG von 1896 (1901-05)
- Port of registry: (German Empire) Hamburg (1892-1905)
- Builder: Joh. C. Tecklenborg, Geestemünde
- Launched: 22 February 1892
- In service: 1892
- Out of service: 18 January 1905
- Identification: Code Letters RJLM
- Fate: Ran aground 18 January 1905

General characteristics
- Tonnage: 2,895 GRT; 2,780 NRT
- Length: 113.00 m (370 ft 9 in) overall; 95.82 m (314 ft 4 in) between perpendiculars
- Beam: 13.58 m (44 ft 7 in)
- Height: 52.50 m (172 ft 3 in) (tallest mast height over waterline)
- Depth: 8.04 m (26 ft 5 in)
- Propulsion: 3,700 square metres (40,000 sq ft) sails
- Sail plan: Barque

Placilla was a four-masted barque which was built for F. Laeisz, Hamburg, Germany in 1892. She was sold in 1901 and renamed Optima in 1903. In 1905 she was wrecked on the Haisborough Sands.

== Description ==
Placilla was built by Joh. C. Tecklenborg in Geestemünde, Germany. She was 113.00 metres (370 ft 9 in) long overall, with a beam of 13.58 metres (44 ft 7 in) and a depth of 13.58 metres (44 ft 7 in). She had four masts and was rigged as a barque, with royal sails over double top and topgallant sails. Her air draught was 52.50 metres (172 ft 3 in). Her sail area was 3,500 square metres (38,000 sq ft). Placilla was a sister ship to Pisagua, which was launched seven months later than she was.

== History ==
Placilla entered service with F Laeisz, Hamburg in 1892. She was used on the route between Germany and Chile. In 1892, Placilla made the voyage from Lizard Point to Valparaíso, Chile, in 58 days. This was a record time. It was equalled by Potosi (1900), Pitlochry (1902), Preußen (1903), Eldora (1904) and Preußen (1905). She recorded a fastest voyage from Iquique, Chile to the English Channel of 71 days and a voyage from Pisagua, Chile to The Lizard in 78 days. In 1901 she was sold to Rhederei AG von 1896, Hamburg. She was renamed Optima in 1903. On 6 January 1905, she departed Hamburg bound for Santa Rosalía, Mexico with a cargo of coke. On 18 January 1905, she ran aground on the misty Haisborough Sands after a storm in the North Sea, off the coast of Norfolk and was wrecked. All of the crew survived.
