= Statsraad Lehmkuhl =

Barque launched in 1914

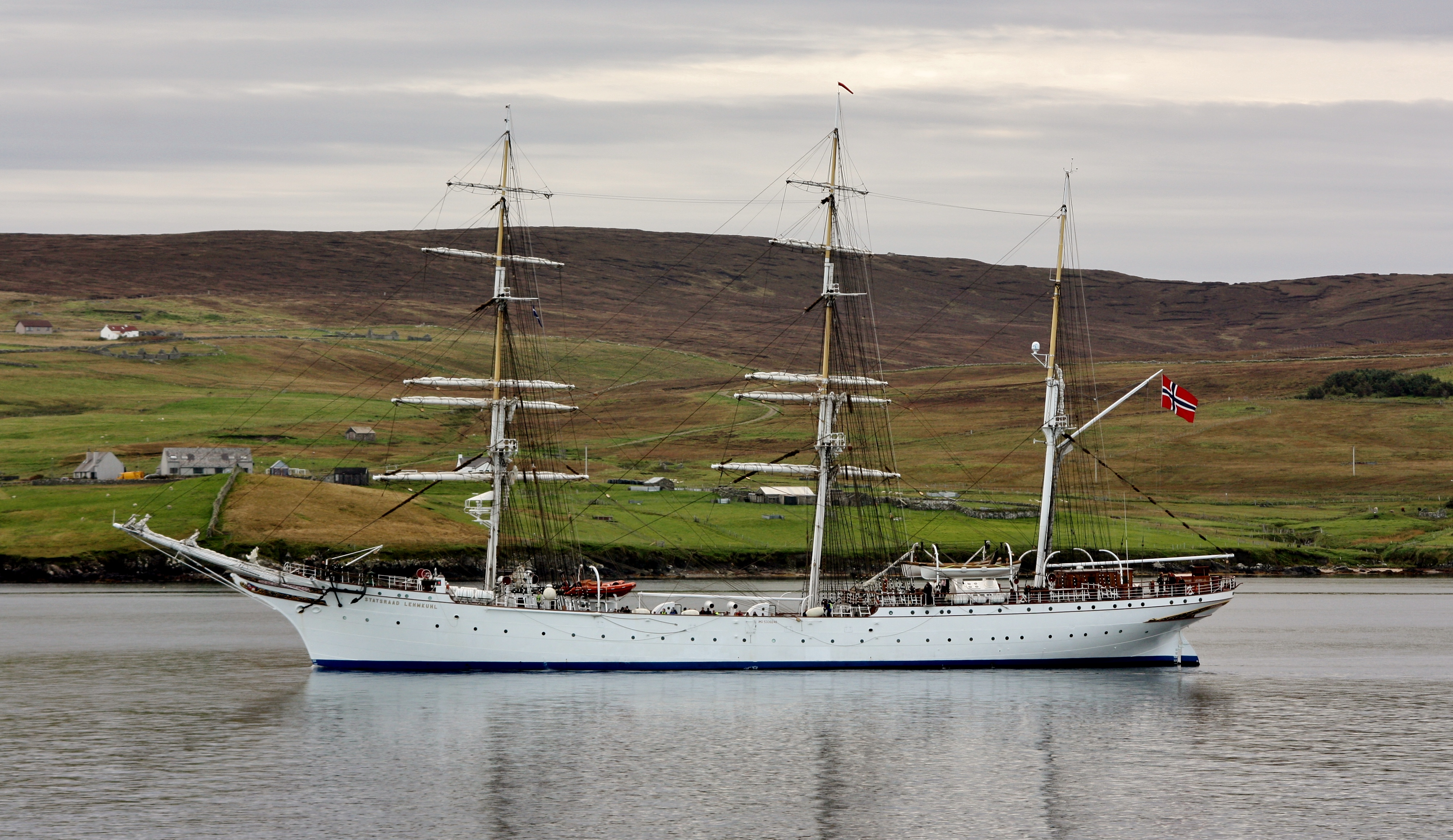
- Statsraad Lehmkuhl arriving in Lerwick, Shetlands (2016)

History

German Empire
- Name: Grossherzog Friedrich August
- Namesake: Grand Duke Friedrich August of Oldenburg
- Builder: Joh. C. Tecklenborg, Bremerhaven
- Launched: 1914
- In service: 1914–1918
- Fate: Given to Britain as war reparation

British Empire
- Acquired: 1920
- Fate: Purchased by Det Bergenske Dampskibsselskab

Norway
- Name: Statsraad Lehmkuhl
- Namesake: Kristofer Lehmkuhl
- Acquired: 1921
- In service: 1923–1940
- Fate: Captured by Nazi Germany

Nazi Germany
- Name: Westwärts
- In service: 1940–1945

Norway
- Name: Statsraad Lehmkuhl
- Namesake: Kristofer Lehmkuhl
- In service: 1945–present
- Identification: IMO number: 5339248; Call sign: LDRG; MMSI number: 258113000
- Status: in active service
- Notes: Training ship

General characteristics
- Tonnage: 1516 tons
- Length: Sparred Length: 98,00 m; (Length of hull): 84,60 m; (Length of waterline): 73,00 m
- Beam: 12,60 m
- Height: Max. Height: 48,00 m
- Draft: 5.20 m
- Propulsion: 22 Sails
- Sail plan: Sail area: 2026 m2
- Speed: 11 knots (engine) / 17 knots (sails)
- Complement: 17 (permanent crew); 150

Statsraad Lehmkuhl is a three-masted barque rigged sail training vessel owned and operated by the Statsraad Lehmkuhl Foundation. It is based in Bergen, Norway and contracted out for various purposes, including serving as a school ship for the Royal Norwegian Navy (using RNoN's prefix "HNoMS").

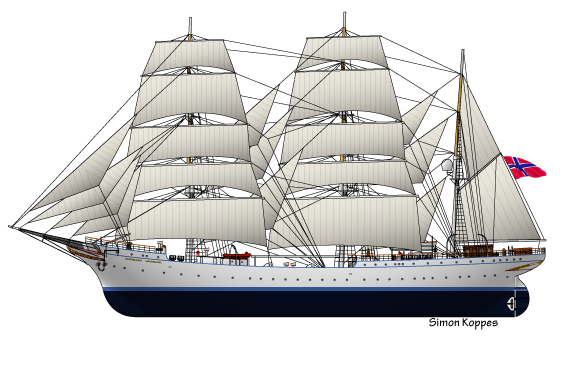
Line art of Statsraad Lehmkuhl

It was built in 1914 by Joh. C. Tecklenborg ship yard in Geestemünde as a school training ship for the German merchant marine under the name Grossherzog Friedrich August. After the First World War the ship was taken as a prize by the United Kingdom and in 1921 the ship was bought by former Norwegian cabinet minister Kristofer Lehmkuhl (hence the name, which means "Cabinet Minister Lehmkuhl"). Except during the Second World War, when she was captured and under the name of Westwärts used by German forces, the ship belonged to Bergens Skoleskib from 1921 until donated to the Foundation in 1978.

In 2000, she was chartered by the German Navy while their Gorch Fock was overhauled.

In 2019 the ship was upgraded from diesel to hybrid power by Kongsberg, whereby a 370 kWh battery bank is charged while the ship is being powered by the wind, and can be used to drive the ship's propellers when the sails no longer provide sufficient power, only relying on the ship's KRM6 diesel engine from Bergen Engines as backup support. The batteries are also used to provide energy for the ship's instruments, lights and galley.

In 2021, the ship featured in an NRK slow TV feature from 6 July to 15 August, sailing from Nordkapp Municipality to Arendal Municipality calling at ports along the Norwegian coastline. In August 2021 Statsraad Lehmkuhl started the "One Ocean Expedition", circumnavigating the world equipped as a scientific research vessel, collecting meteorological and hydrographical data along with samples of fish, microplastics, zooplankton, eDNA, and carbon dioxide in the water. The ship was hired by marine research institutions on some of the legs.

In spring of 2022 the Ocean Frontier Institute sponsored undergraduate students from Dalhousie University in Halifax and Memorial University of Newfoundland on a 16-week expedition aboard the ship. The students participated as crew members following an ocean sustainability course offered through Norway's University of Bergen.

Name pennant of the Statsraad Lehmkuhl, usually flown from the ship's main mast

The ship has participated numerous times in the Tall Ship Races persistently finishing high in standing in her class.

== Sister ships ==
The three sister ships of Statsraad Lehmkuhl also survive:

- Dar Pomorza (originally Prinzess Eitel Friedrich)
- Duchesse Anne (originally Großherzogin Elisabeth)
- Schulschiff Deutschland

== See also ==
- List of large sailing vessels
