= Pettersson =

Origin
- Origin: Biblical
- Meaning: "son of Peter"
- Region of origin: Scandinavia

Other names
- Variant form: Petersen Petterson

Pettersson is a common Swedish patronymic surname, meaning "son of Peter".

== Geographical distribution ==
As of 2014, 92.7% of all known bearers of the surname Pettersson were residents of Sweden (frequency 1:151), 1.7% of Finland (1:4,550), 1.3% of Norway (1:5,791) and 1.0% of Denmark (1:8,338).

In Sweden, the frequency of the surname was higher than national average (1:151) in the following counties:

1. Gotland County (1:34)
2. Södermanland County (1:72)
3. Västmanland County (1:75)
4. Örebro County (1:80)
5. Uppsala County (1:87)
6. Östergötland County (1:101)
7. Västernorrland County (1:126)
8. Gävleborg County (1:129)
9. Dalarna County (1:134)
10. Norrbotten County (1:137)
11. Värmland County (1:143)

In Finland, the frequency of the surname was higher than national average (1:4,550) in the following regions:

1. Åland (1:182)
2. Ostrobothnia (1:1,224)
3. Southwest Finland (1:2,209)
4. Uusimaa (1:3,525)
5. Central Ostrobothnia (1:3,934)

== People ==
- Albert Pettersson, Swedish Olympic weightlifter
- Aline Pettersson, Mexican writer
- Allan Pettersson, Swedish composer
- Allan Rune Pettersson, Swedish writer
- Anna Pettersson, Swedish lawyer
- Anton Lundin Pettersson (1994–2015), Swedish murderer, perpetrator of the Trollhättan school stabbing
- Berta Persson (née Pettersson) (1893–1961), first woman bus driver in Sweden.
- Birgitta Pettersson, Swedish film actor
- Bjarne Pettersson, Danish football player
- Carl Pettersson, Swedish golfer
- Christer Pettersson, Swedish criminal
- Elias Pettersson, Swedish ice hockey player
- Elias Pettersson (ice hockey, born 2004), Swedish ice hockey player
- Erik Pettersson (disambiguation), multiple people
- Fredrik Pettersson, Swedish ice hockey player
- Gert Pettersson, Swedish orienteer
- Göran Pettersson, Swedish politician
- Gösta Pettersson, Swedish road racing cyclist
- Gösta Pettersson, Swedish biochemist
- Hans Pettersson, Swedish atomic physicist and oceanographer
- Holger Pettersson, Swedish radiologist and educator
- Ingvar Pettersson, Swedish athlete
- Isak Pettersson, Swedish football player
- Joel Pettersson, Finnish painter and writer
- Johan Pettersson (disambiguation), multiple people
- Jörgen Pettersson (footballer), Swedish football player
- Jörgen Pettersson (ice hockey), Swedish ice hockey player
- Katja Pettersson, Finnish designer
- Kjell-Ronnie Pettersson, Swedish ice hockey player
- Leif Pettersson, Swedish politician
- Linus Pettersson, Swedish bandy player
- Marcus Pettersson, Swedish ice hockey player
- Marina Pettersson, Swedish politician
- Pelle Pettersson, Swedish yachtsman and yacht designer
- Rolf Pettersson, Swedish orienteer
- Ronald Pettersson, Swedish ice hockey player
- Ronney Pettersson, Swedish football player
- Stefan Pettersson (footballer), Swedish football player
- Stefan Pettersson (ice hockey), Swedish ice hockey player
- Sten Pettersson, Swedish athlete
- Sven Pettersson, Swedish ski jumper
- Sven Otto Pettersson (1848–1941), Swedish oceanographer and chemist
- Sven-Pelle Pettersson, Swedish swimmer and water polo player
- Wivan Pettersson, Swedish swimmer

== See also ==
- Pedersen
- Petersen
- Peterson
- Petterson
- Petersson
