= List of museums in Åland =

This is a list of museums in Åland.

== Museums in Åland ==
- Åland Hunting and Fishing Museum
- Åland Maritime Museum
- Åland Museum
- Eckerö Mail and Customs House
- Kastelholm Castle
- Pommern (ship)

== See also ==
- List of museums
- List of archives in Åland
- List of libraries in Åland
