= Von Knorring =

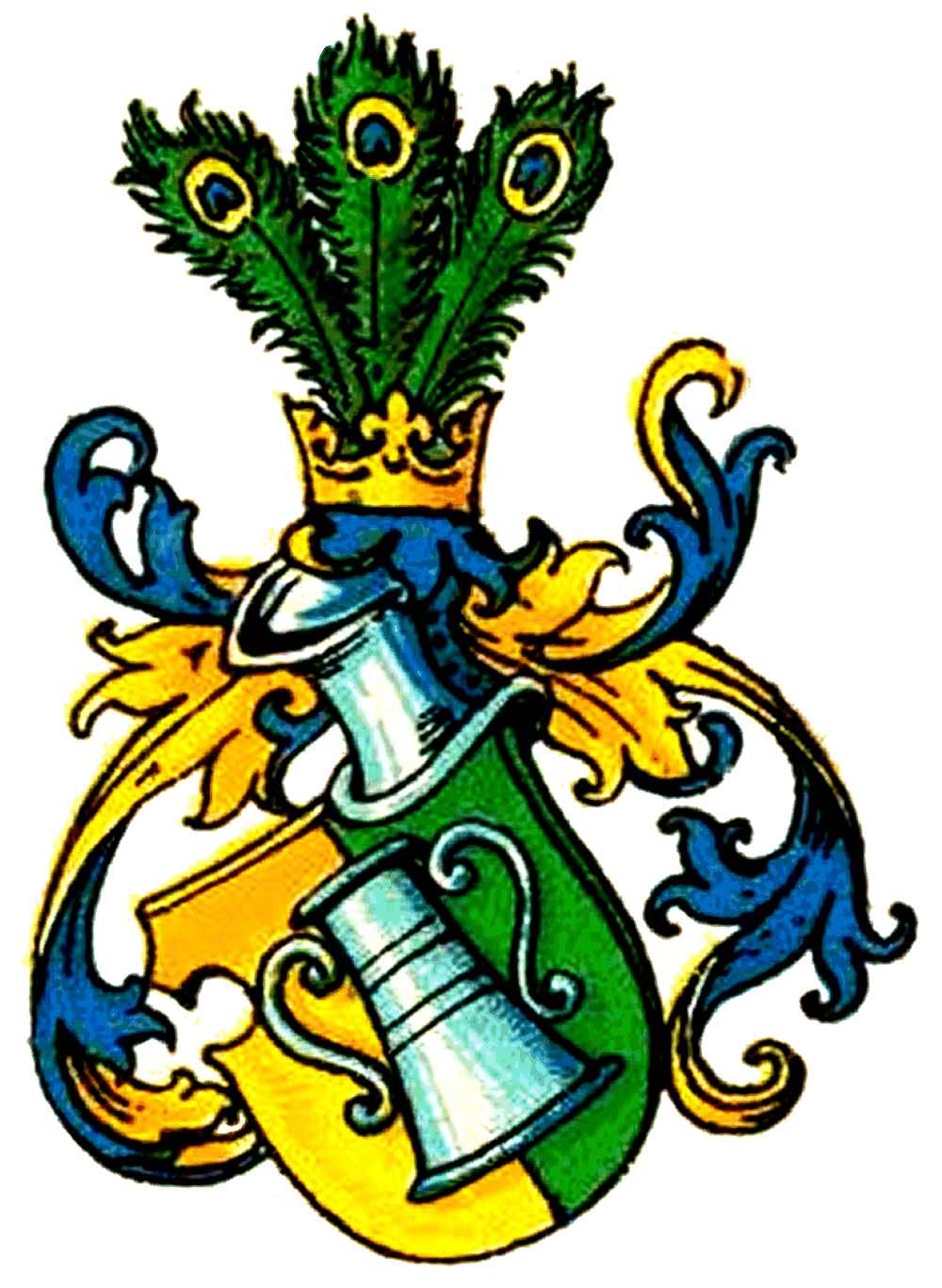
Coat of arms of the Knorring family

The Knorring family also spelled von Knorring is the name of an old Baltic-German noble family, whose members held significant positions within the Russian Empire and Scandinavia. They also held the title of Baron in Sweden and in Prussia.

== Notable members ==
- Bogdan von Knorring (1744–1825), Russian general
- Karl Heinrich von Knorring (1746-1820), Russian Lieutenant general
- Frans Peter von Knorring (1792–1875), Finnish social reformer
- Sophie von Knorring (1797–1848), Swedish novelist and noble
- Sophie von Knorring, (1775–1833), German writer born Sophie Tieck
- Olga Knorring (1887-1978), Russian botanist

Other

- F.P. von Knorring (ship), ship in Mariehamn, named after the Finnish reformer.
