= Georg Kåhre =

Åland writer

George Kåhre (26 August 1899, in Mariehamn – 12 December 1969) was a teacher and author in Åland, Finland. He wrote poetry and prose, as well as factual books.

Kåhre debuted in 1928 with the poetry anthology Staden med de tusen lindarna, released under the pseudonym Stefan Sylwander. He would use this pseudonym until 1933, when his first novel, Strandhugg, was released under his own name. The novel won a shared first prize in a contest organized by a Swedish publisher.

Kåhre's most famous work in English is probably The Last Tall Ships: Gustav Erikson and the Åland Sailing Fleets 1872–1947, a translation of Den åländska segelsjöfartens historia (first published in 1940 by Åland Maritime Museum), which was released posthumously in 1978.

Two poetry anthologies, Ord och vågor and Söndag i världen, were released after his death.

== Bibliography ==
=== Poetry, as Stefan Sylwander ===
- Staden med de tusen lindarna (1928)
- Vers från havskanten (1929)
- Fromma visor (1930)
- Väderilar (1932)

=== Poetry, as Georg Kåhre ===
- Dikt och pamflett (1939)
- Ord och vågor (1970)
- Söndag i världen (1983)

=== Novels ===
- Strandhugg (1933)
- Bror Ahasverus (1942)
- Knutar på fånglinan (1953)

=== Others ===
- Den åländska segelsjöfartens historia (1940), English edition: The Last Tall Ships: Gustav Erikson and the Åland Sailing Fleets 1872–1947 (1978)
- Ålands ömsesidiga försäkringsbolag (1941)
- Ålands aktiebank (1944)
- Under Gustaf Eriksons flagga (1948)
- Sjöfart och skeppsbyggeri på Åland (1949)
- Ålands redarförening r.f. 1934–1959 (1959)
- Åland (1959)
- 50 år under Gustav Eriksons flagga (1963)
