= Western Harbour (Mariehamn) =

Western Harbour, Mariehamn
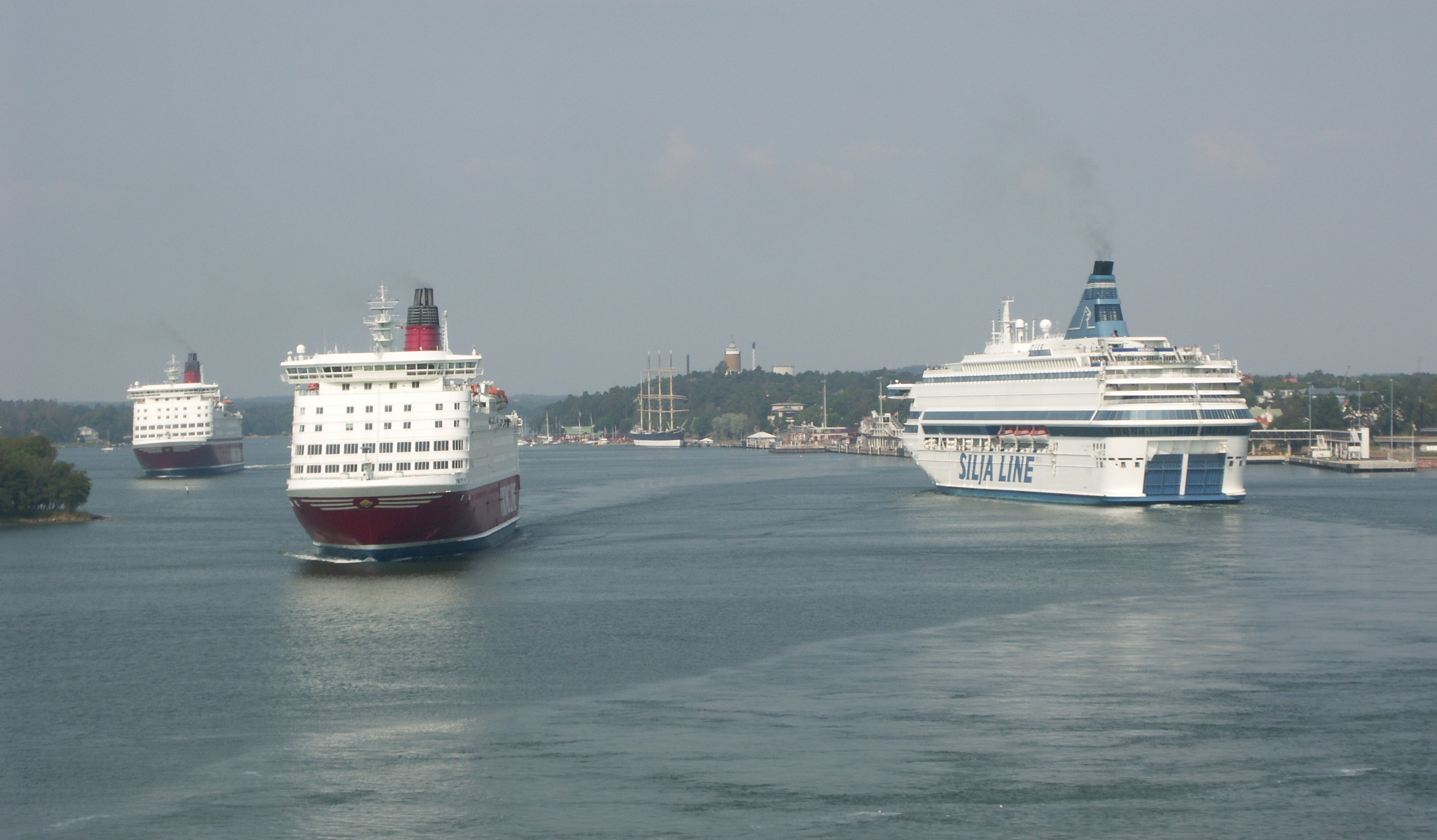
- Ferries in the port of Mariehamn
- Interactive map of Western Harbour, Mariehamn
- Location in Finland
- Native name: Västerhamn (Swedish)

Location
- Country: Finland
- Location: Mariehamn, Åland
- Coordinates: 60.093056°N 19.927222°E
- UN/LOCODE: FI MHQ

Details
- Operated by: Mariehamns Hamn AB
- Type of harbour: coastal natural
- No. of wharfs: 6
- Draft depth: max. 9.2 metres (30 ft) depth

Statistics
- Annual cargo tonnage: c. 46,000 tons (int'l) (2018)
- Passenger traffic: c. 2.5m (int'l, total) (2018)
- Website mariehamnshamn.ax/en/

The Western Harbour (Swedish: Västerhamn, Finnish: Länsisatama) is one of two harbours in the port of Mariehamn, the regional capital of Åland, Finland, in the Archipelago Sea part of the Baltic.

== Passenger traffic and duty-free sales ==
Most cruiseferry routes between southern mainland Finland and Sweden, as well as between Estonia and Sweden, call at Mariehamn. This is largely due to Åland being outside of the EU customs regime, which allows vessels calling at an Åland port to sell duty-free goods.

With an average of 15 daily ferry sailings, and approximately 20 international cruise ships visiting Mariehamn each year, the Western Harbour is the third-busiest international passenger port in Finland with c. 1.25 million annual passenger arrivals (2.5m total passenger movements) in 2018.

== Navigation ==
The shipping lane into the Western Harbour has a maximum depth of 9.2 metres (30 ft) and a minimum navigable width of 200 metres (660 ft).

The harbour remains ice-free most winters, or is only covered by thin ice.

== Attractions ==
The museum ship Pommern, a four-masted iron-hulled sailing ship built in 1903, is moored in the Western Harbour as an exhibit of the Åland Maritime Museum.

Mariehamn's other harbour, the Eastern Harbour (Swedish: Österhamn, Finnish: Itäsatama), is mainly used for smaller leisure boats and yachts, and is one of the largest leisure marinas in the Nordic region.

== See also ==
- Ports of the Baltic Sea
