= Åland Museum =

Cultural History Museum of Åland and Åland Islands Art Museum
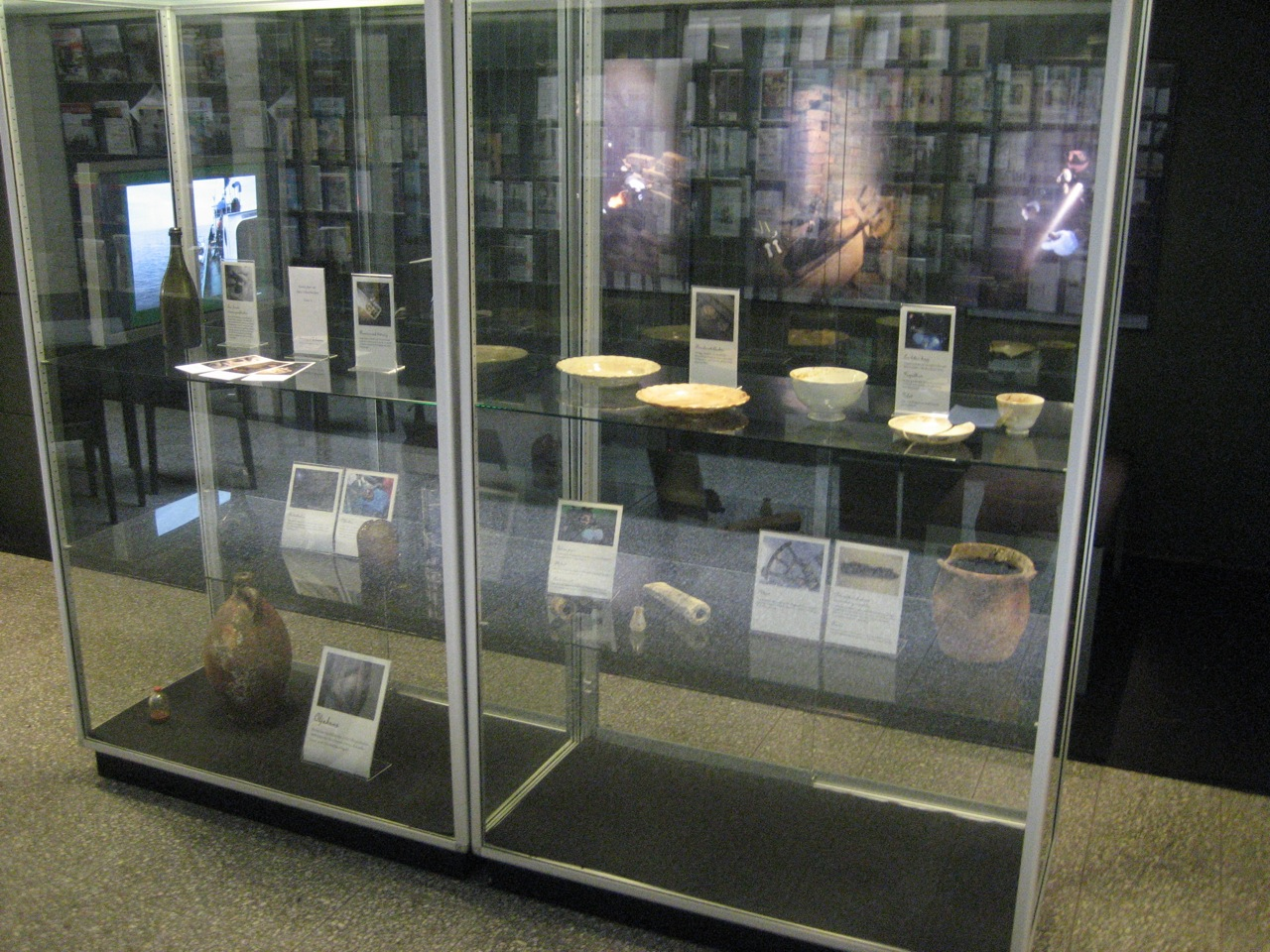

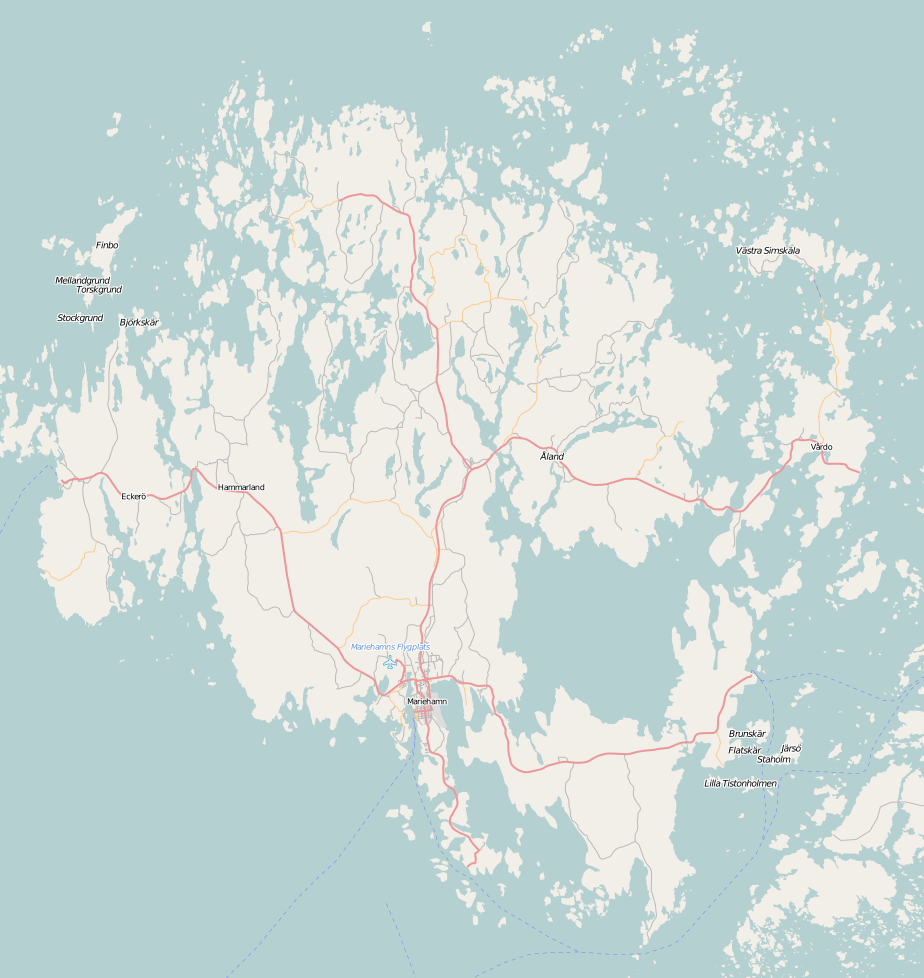
- Location in Åland
- Established: 1963
- Location: Mariehamn, Åland Islands
- Coordinates: 60.096944°N 19.944722°E
- Type: General history and art museum

The Cultural History Museum of Åland and Åland Islands Art Museum are two museums under the same roof in Mariehamn in Åland (Finland). The building houses even other collections and staff of Ålands Museum, which was formerly the name of the Cultural History Museum, nowadays a wider roof organization for several museums. The building is located in the eastern part of the town, about 200 metres from the harbour. Along with Åland Maritime Museum it is the most important museum in the islands. The art museum is referred to in the Swedish language as the "Konstmuseum" and in Swedish, the Cultural History Museum is often shortened to "Kulturhistoriska".

The Cultural History Museum of Åland traces the history of the islands from prehistoric times up until the present day while the Art Museum houses a permanent collection of local art as well as interesting temporary exhibitions. The museum plays an inspirational place for display of culture of both Finland and Sweden.

The museum documents the complete history of the development of the islands. which are politically Finnish but culturally Swedish), from prehistoric times onwards until date, is exhibited.

Local artists are provided opportunities to display their paintings in exclusive areas of the museum. Ten such exhibitions are held every year on varying themes.

== Cultural History Museum of Åland ==
The Cultural History Museum of Åland has a permanent collection of artifacts providing details of the history of Åland from prehistoric times to the modern period. Many displays are related to local music, festivals, seafaring and wildlife. Between September 15 and October 17, 2010, the museum hosted a special exhibition containing artifacts found in a shipwreck. This exhibition of treasures found in summer of 2010 was of a shipwreck that occurred in the Baltic Sea in the 19th century. The treasures of the ship on display included the world's oldest champagne & beer bottles.

The Åland Museum was awarded the Council of Europe Museum Prize on April 26, 1983, at Chateau des Rohan.

== Åland Islands Art Museum ==
The Art Museum has its origins in 1955, when the Åland Art Association proposed it and set up a Landscape Board two years later. A committee for the arts was established and in 1963 they inaugurated the new Åland Art Museum, to be managed by the Åland government. Åland Art Museum contains a broad range of Åland art, from sculptures and paintings to contemporary video art and has some innovative special art exhibitions. Most of the displays are permanent although it also hosts regular temporary displays of local artists.

Prominent canvases exhibited are those of famous local artists like Joel Pettersson (1892–1937) and Karl Emanuel Jansson.”

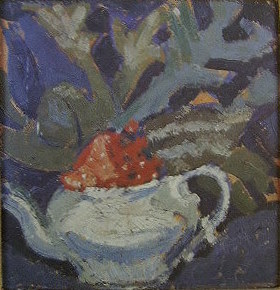
Art by Joel Pettersson

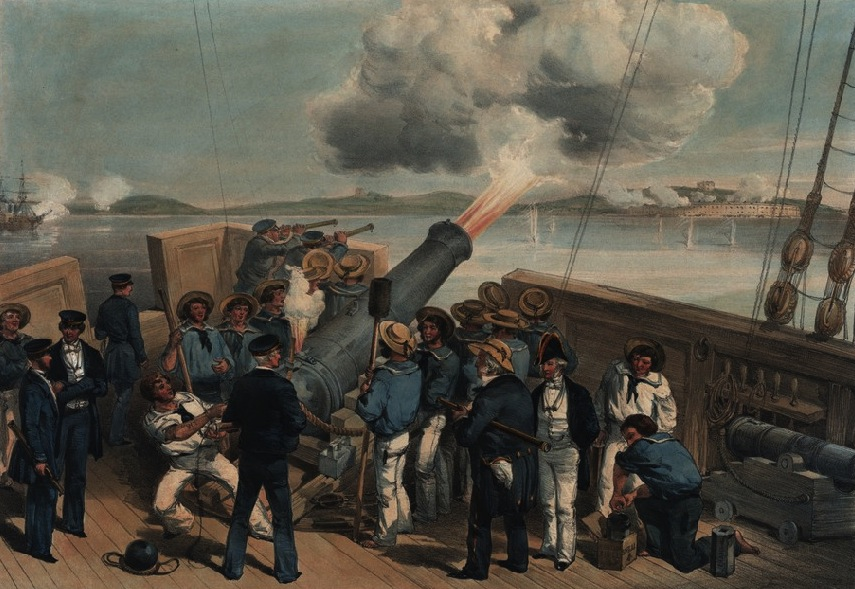
A Lithograph from the Seat of the War in the East by William Simpson, which shows bombardment of Bomarsund during the Crimean War

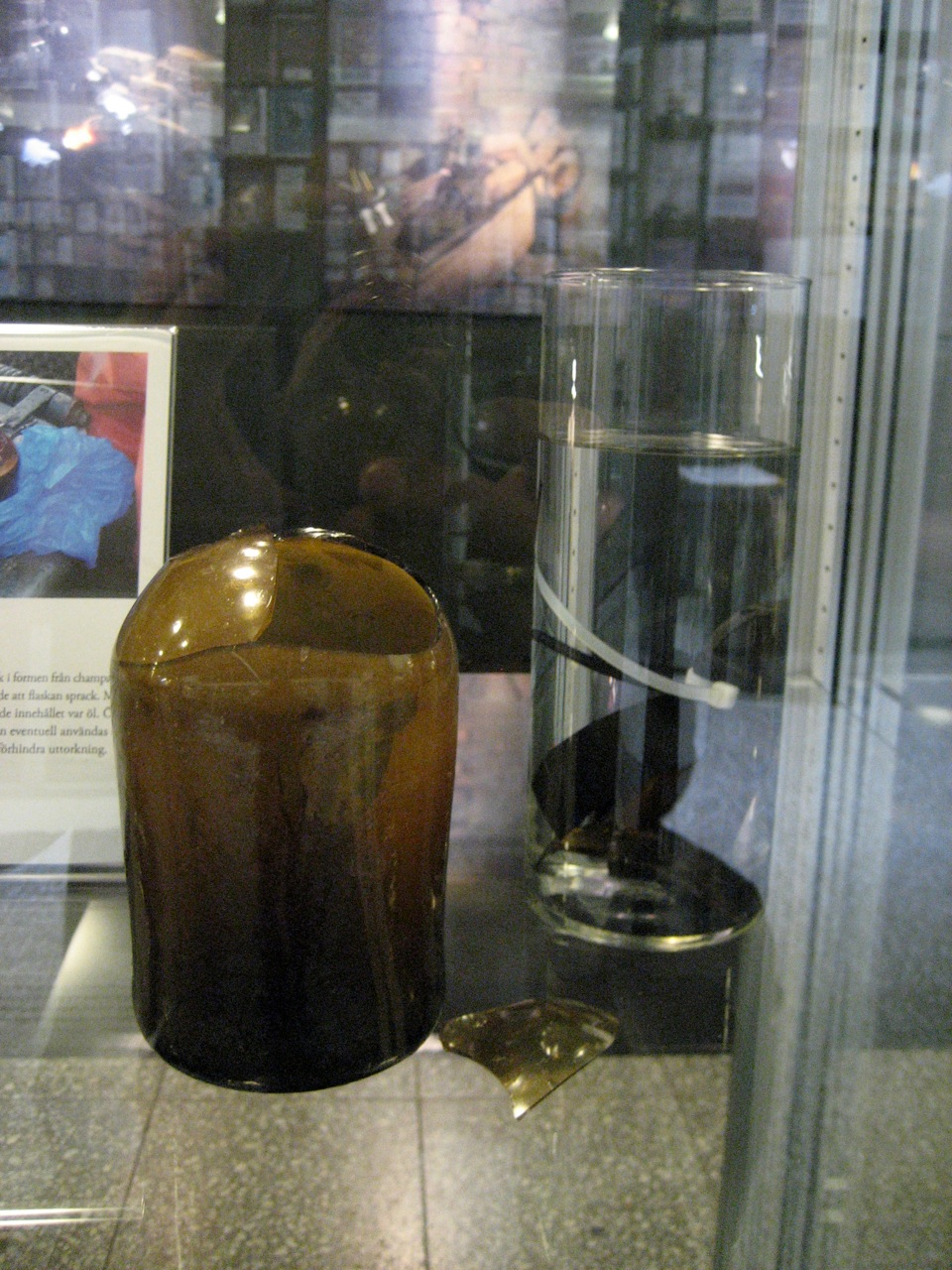
Broken beer-bottle found in shipwreck that occurred in 19th century in the Baltic Sea was on display in the museum in September 2010
