= Petersson =

Petersson is a Swedish patronymic surname meaning "son of Peter". There are alternate Danish, Dutch, English, German, Latvian and Norwegian spellings. Numbers in Sweden:

- Petersson 26 236
- Peterson 1 963
- Peterzon 50
- Petersohn 24

Notable people with the surname include:

- Alexander Petersson, Latvian/Icelandic handball player
- Alfred Petersson (1860–1920), Swedish politician
- André Petersson, Swedish ice hockey player
- Axel Petersson, Swedish engineer
- Axel Petersson Döderhultarn (1868–1925), Swedish Master woodcarver
- Bo Petersson, Swedish football manager and former football player
- Bobbo Petersson (born 1992), Swedish ice hockey player
- Göran Petersson, Swedish lawyer, sailor and sports official
- Gunnar Petersson, Swedish javelin thrower
- Harald G. Petersson (1904–1977), German screenwriter
- Hans Joakim Petersson, Swedish rockstar
- Hans Petersson (1902–1984), German mathematician
- Håvard Vad Petersson, Norwegian curler
- Helene Petersson, Swedish social democratic politician
- Johan Petersson (handballer), Swedish handball player
- Johan Petersson (comedian), Swedish comedian, actor, television presenter and author
- Johanna Petersson (1807–1899), pioneering Swedish businesswoman
- Lars G. Petersson (born 1951), Swedish-British human rights activist
- Magnus Petersson, Swedish archer
- Rudolf Petersson (1896–1970), Swedish artist and creator of a popular Swedish comic
- Simon Petersson, Swedish ice hockey defenceman
- Tom Petersson, American bassist for the rock band Cheap Trick
- Torkel Petersson, Swedish actor
- Viljo Petersson-Dahl (born 1982), Swedish wheelchair curler
- William Petersson (1895–1965), Swedish athlete
