= Petterson =

Petterson is a Scandinavian and Dutch surname. Notable people with the surname include:

- Andy Petterson (born 1969), Australian soccer player
- Donald K. Petterson (born 1930), United States foreign service officer
- Mark Petterson, British businessman
- Pelle Petterson (born 1932), Swedish yachtsman and boat designer
- Per Petterson (born 1952), Norwegian novelist
- Cody Petterson (born 1976), American political activist

== See also ==
- Pettersson
- Patterson (surname), Patterson (disambiguation)
- Peterson (name)
- Petersen
