= Mariehamn =

Capital and largest city of Åland

- Capital city
- Mariehamns stad Town of Mariehamn
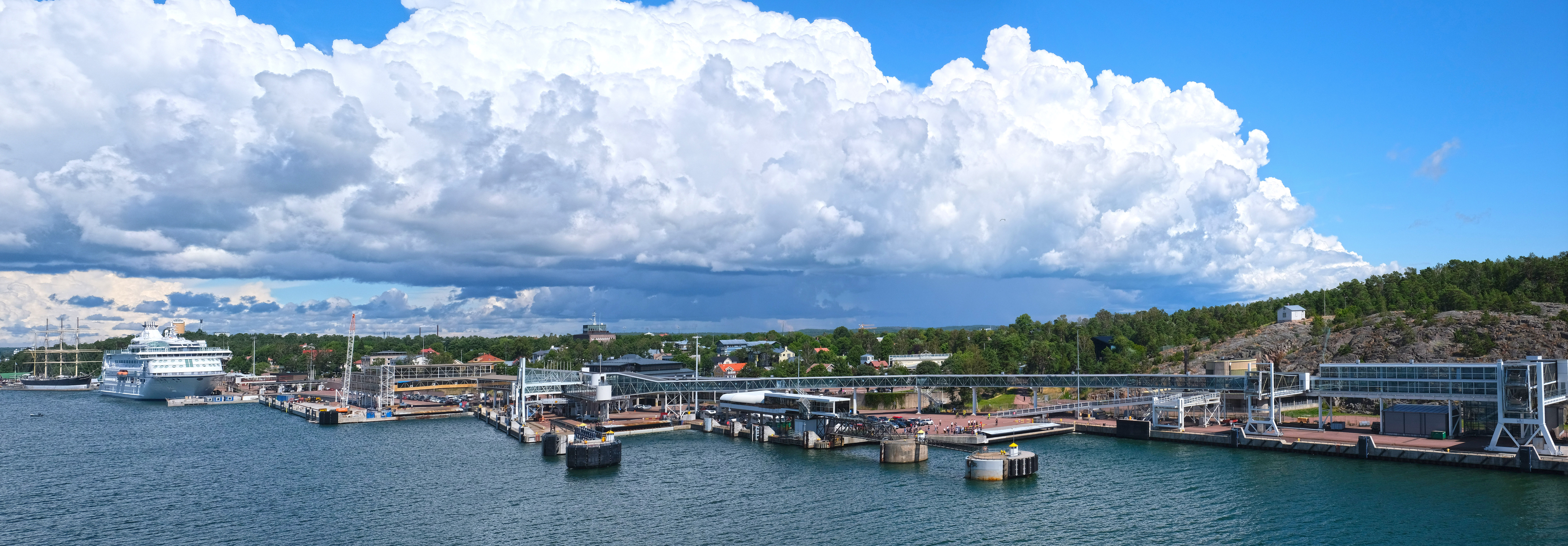
- Västerhamn ferry terminal

- Coat of arms
- Nickname: De tusen lindarnas stad (lit. 'The town of a thousand linden trees')
- Interactive map of Mariehamn
- Location within the Åland Islands
- Coordinates: 60°06′N 19°56′E
- Country: Finland
- Autonomous Region: Åland
- Sub-region: Mariehamn
- Charter: 21 February 1861; 165 years ago
- Named for: Maria Alexandrovna

Government
  - Mayor: Arne Selander

Area
  - Total: 20.75 km^{2} (8.01 sq mi)
  - Land: 11.81 km^{2} (4.56 sq mi)

Population (2025-12-31)
  - Total: 11,957
  - Density: 1,012.45/km^{2} (2,622.2/sq mi)
- Time zone: UTC+02:00 (EET)
  - Summer (DST): UTC+03:00 (EEST)
- Postal code: 22100, 22101, 22110, 22111, 22120, 22140, 22150, 22160
- Website: www.mariehamn.ax

Mariehamn (/məˈriːəhɑːmən/ mə-REE-ə-hah-mən, Finland Swedish: [mɑriːeˈhɑmn]; Finnish: Maarianhamina [ˈmɑːriɑnˌhɑminɑ]; Latin: Portus Mariae) is the capital of Åland, an autonomous region of Finland, and the seat of its government and parliament.

Mariehamn lies on the main island of Åland. It has about 40% of the region’s population. The city is Swedish-speaking, and most residents have Swedish as their native language.

Mariehamn borders Jomala to the north and west and Lemland to the east.

The coat of arms of Mariehamn reflects the city’s maritime economy and its linden-lined parks. It was designed by Nils Byman and confirmed in 1951.

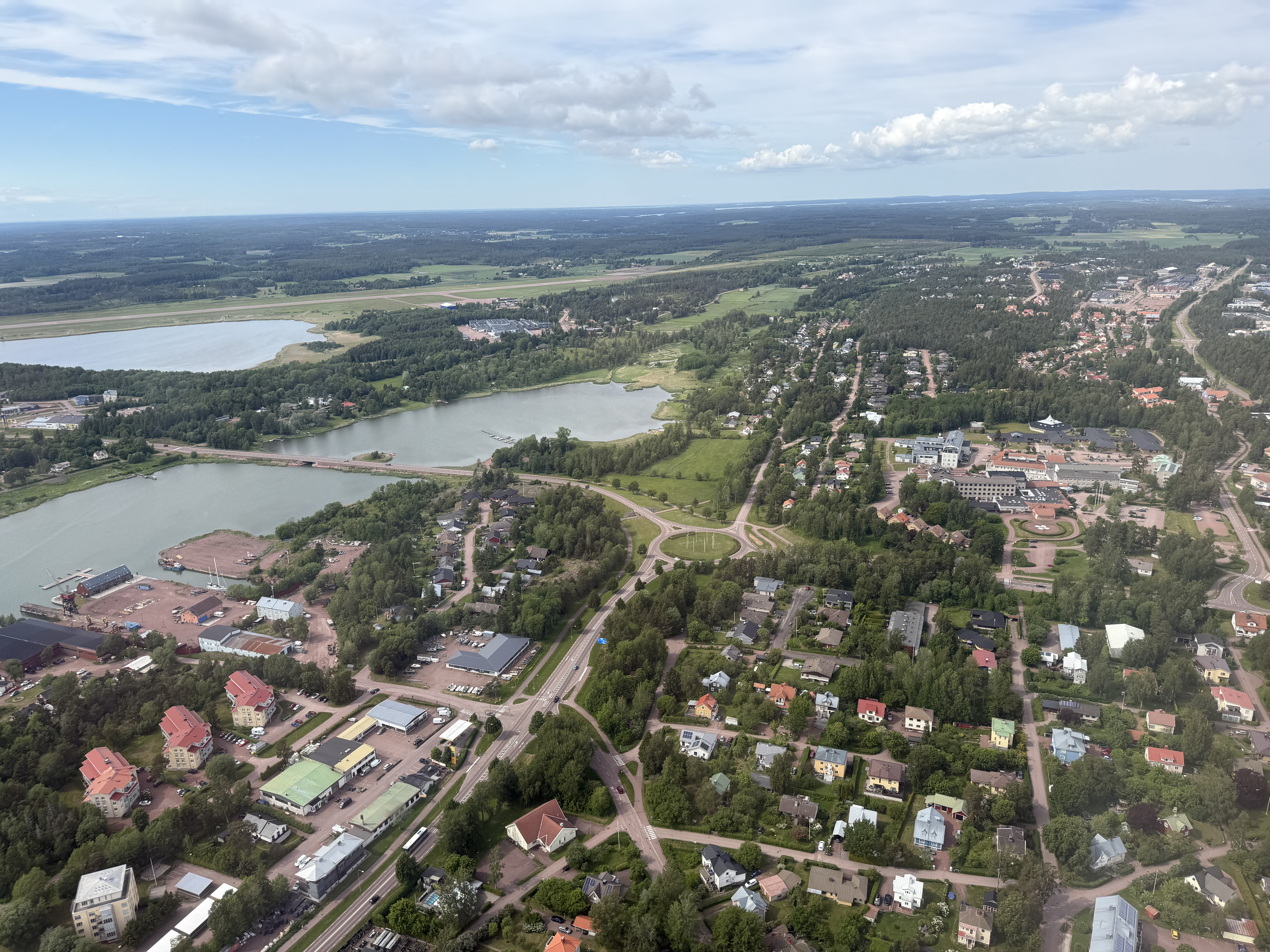
Aerial photo of Mariehamn taken in 2026. You can see the Mariehamn Airport in the top.

Mariehamn and all of Åland is a popular summer destination, with about 1.5 million visitors each year.

== History ==
Mariehamn was founded on 21 February 1861 on land that belonged to the village of Övernäs in Jomala. It was named after the Russian empress Maria Alexandrovna (1824–1880), meaning lit. 'Marie's Port'.

The town grew from a planned layout that remains largely intact. It later expanded into Jomala. One of the oldest streets is Södragatan, which has preserved 19th-century wooden houses.

Map showing Mariehamn and the pre-1961 town area (hatched)

In the late 19th century, shipping became central to the local economy, and shipowners and shipyards settled in the town.

After the First World War, Mariehamn became known for its Grain Fleet.

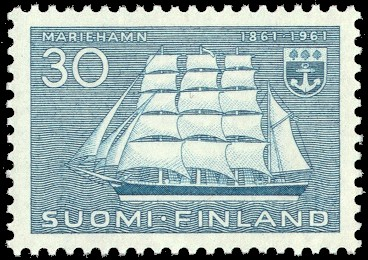
Finnish stamp marking Mariehamn's centenary (1961)

On 8 November 1963, a plane crash in Mariehamn killed 22 of 25 people, Finland’s second-deadliest air accident.

== Demographics ==
=== Population growth ===
Mariehamn's population grew steadily from under 10,000 in the late 1980s to over 11,800 by 2024. Based on data from Ålands statistik- och utredningsbyrå (ÅSUB), the city's population by year was:

Population by year
Year	Population
1987	9,966
1990	10,263
1997	10,408
2000	10,488
2002	10,632
2004	10,712
2006	10,824
2008	11,005
2009	11,123
2010	11,190
2011	11,262
2012	11,346
2013	11,393
2014	11,480
2015	11,461
2016	11,565
2017	11,677
2018	11,743
2019	11,679
2020	11,705
2021	11,742
2022	11,757
2023	11,812
2024	11,866

=== Foreign-born residents ===
As of 2018, the largest groups of foreign-born residents in Mariehamn were:

Foreign-born residents of Mariehamn by country of birth (2018)
Country	Population	%
Sweden	1,093	9.55
Romania	173	1.51
Latvia	163	1.42
Iran	101	0.85
Estonia	92	0.80
Russia	86	0.75
Yugoslavia	86	0.75
Thailand	73	0.64
Philippines	55	0.48
United Kingdom	45	0.39

== Transport ==
=== Airport ===
Mariehamn Airport serves the city with regular flights operated by Finnair and regional airlines.

=== Harbours ===
Mariehamn lies on a peninsula with two main harbours, west and east. Both remain ice-free for most of the year and experience minimal tidal variation.

The Western Harbour is an international port with daily ferry connections to Sweden, Estonia, and mainland Finland. Because Åland is outside the EU customs zone, ferries call at Mariehamn to enable duty-free sales.

The city has a long maritime tradition. The four-masted barque Pommern, now part of the Åland Maritime Museum, is moored in the Western Harbour. The Eastern Harbour hosts one of the largest marinas in Scandinavia and the historic Dutch steamer F.P. von Knorring, named after Åland teacher and vicar Frans Peter von Knorring.

=== Roads ===
Three of Åland's four main roads begin in Mariehamn: Åland Highway 1 (Main Road 1) to Eckerö, Åland Highway 2 (Main Road 2) to Sund, and Åland Highway 3 (Main Road 3) to Lumparland.

== Culture ==
=== Media ===
Mariehamn is the centre of Åland's media. Both local newspapers, Ålandstidningen and Nya Åland, several radio stations, and the television channels TV Åland and Åland24 operate from the city.

=== Libraries and publishing ===
The first public libraries on Åland opened before 1920, and a printing house was founded in 1891. The municipal library, completed in 1989, is known for its modern architecture.

=== Museums ===
- Åland Maritime Museum – maritime history and the ship Pommern
- Åland Museum – cultural and natural history of Åland
- Övernässtugan – 18th-century farmhouse
- Sjökvarteret – boatbuilding and maritime crafts centre

== Architecture and landmarks ==
Several buildings in Mariehamn were designed by Finnish architect Lars Sonck, including the church of Mariehamn (1927), the main building of the Åland Maritime College (1927), and the town hall (1939). Hilda Hongell also designed wooden houses, though few remain.

The main parish church of Mariehamn is the Church of St George, opened in 1927, expanded in 1959, and renovated in 1972. The interior features painted wooden ceiling panels by Finnish artist Bruno Tuukkanen and golden mosaics behind the altar illustrating the life of Christ. Decorative items include a ship model, Tjerimaj, and a 37-stop organ built in stages between 1969 and 1982.

== Climate ==
Mariehamn has a transitional climate between an oceanic (Cfb) and a humid continental (Dfb) type, according to the Köppen climate classification. The Baltic Sea moderates temperature extremes, resulting in mild winters and cool summers.

Summers are cooler than in most of Sweden and Finland, while winters are milder, similar to those on the Swedish coast.

- Lowest recorded temperature: −32.9 °C (−27.2 °F) in February 1979, Mariehamn Airport
- Highest recorded temperature: 31.5 °C (88.7 °F) in July 2018, Western Harbour

Data from the Finnish Meteorological Institute provide climate averages for 1991–2020 and historical records since 1914.

Climate data for Mariehamn Airport normals 1991–2020, extremes 1914–present
Month	Jan	Feb	Mar	Apr	May	Jun	Jul	Aug	Sep	Oct	Nov	Dec	Year
Record high °C (°F)	10.9 (51.6)	10.5 (50.9)	17.0 (62.6)	21.1 (70.0)	27.1 (80.8)	29.4 (84.9)	31.3 (88.3)	30.7 (87.3)	25.7 (78.3)	19.0 (66.2)	16.6 (61.9)	11.1 (52.0)	31.3 (88.3)
Mean maximum °C (°F)	5.8 (42.4)	5.8 (42.4)	9.9 (49.8)	15.3 (59.5)	21.8 (71.2)	23.5 (74.3)	26.0 (78.8)	25.0 (77.0)	19.5 (67.1)	14.6 (58.3)	9.9 (49.8)	7.0 (44.6)	26.9 (80.4)
Mean daily maximum °C (°F)	1.0 (33.8)	0.4 (32.7)	3.1 (37.6)	8.0 (46.4)	13.4 (56.1)	17.5 (63.5)	20.8 (69.4)	20.0 (68.0)	15.5 (59.9)	9.6 (49.3)	5.2 (41.4)	2.5 (36.5)	9.8 (49.6)
Daily mean °C (°F)	−1.3 (29.7)	−2.3 (27.9)	−0.2 (31.6)	3.8 (38.8)	8.9 (48.0)	13.3 (55.9)	16.8 (62.2)	16.1 (61.0)	11.8 (53.2)	6.8 (44.2)	3.2 (37.8)	0.4 (32.7)	6.4 (43.5)
Mean daily minimum °C (°F)	−4.3 (24.3)	−5.5 (22.1)	−3.7 (25.3)	−0.1 (31.8)	4.0 (39.2)	8.6 (47.5)	12.2 (54.0)	11.6 (52.9)	7.8 (46.0)	3.5 (38.3)	0.6 (33.1)	−2.5 (27.5)	2.7 (36.9)
Mean minimum °C (°F)	−15.5 (4.1)	−15.8 (3.6)	−13.1 (8.4)	−5.8 (21.6)	−2.8 (27.0)	2.1 (35.8)	5.5 (41.9)	4.3 (39.7)	0.1 (32.2)	−5.2 (22.6)	−7.3 (18.9)	−10.7 (12.7)	−19.1 (−2.4)
Record low °C (°F)	−32.3 (−26.1)	−32.9 (−27.2)	−25.0 (−13.0)	−18.9 (−2.0)	−6.5 (20.3)	−3.2 (26.2)	0.1 (32.2)	−0.5 (31.1)	−6.7 (19.9)	−11.8 (10.8)	−20.0 (−4.0)	−28.9 (−20.0)	−32.9 (−27.2)
Average precipitation mm (inches)	53 (2.1)	35 (1.4)	38 (1.5)	31 (1.2)	35 (1.4)	53 (2.1)	52 (2.0)	76 (3.0)	61 (2.4)	70 (2.8)	71 (2.8)	59 (2.3)	634 (25)
Average precipitation days	17	13	12	9	10	10	9	13	12	16	17	17	155
Mean monthly sunshine hours	39	74	130	207	297	296	312	235	163	91	41	26	1,911
Source 1: FMI climatological normals for Finland 1991–2020
Source 2: record highs and lows 1961 – present FMI (record highs and lows 1914-1961)

== Twin towns ==
Mariehamn has the following twin towns:

- Iceland – Kópavogur
- Norway – Kragerø
- Estonia – Kuressaare
- Russia – Lomonosov, Russia – partnership suspended in 2022 after the Russian invasion of Ukraine
- Denmark – Slagelse
- Faroe Islands – Tórshavn
- Finland – Valkeakoski
- Sweden – Visby

== Notable people ==
- Jeremy Duns (born 1973), British author and former journalist who lives in Mariehamn
- Gustaf Erikson (1872–1947), shipowner who operated sailing ships
- Maggie Gripenberg (1881–1976), dancer and choreographer
- Georg Kåhre (1899–1969), teacher and author
- Henrik Klingenberg (born 1978), musician and member of the Finnish band Sonata Arctica
- Stefan Lindfors (born 1962), designer, filmmaker and sculptor
- Ville Salminen (1908–1992), film actor and director
- Adelina Engman (born 1984), footballer
- Olivia Ulenius (born 2007), footballer

== Images ==
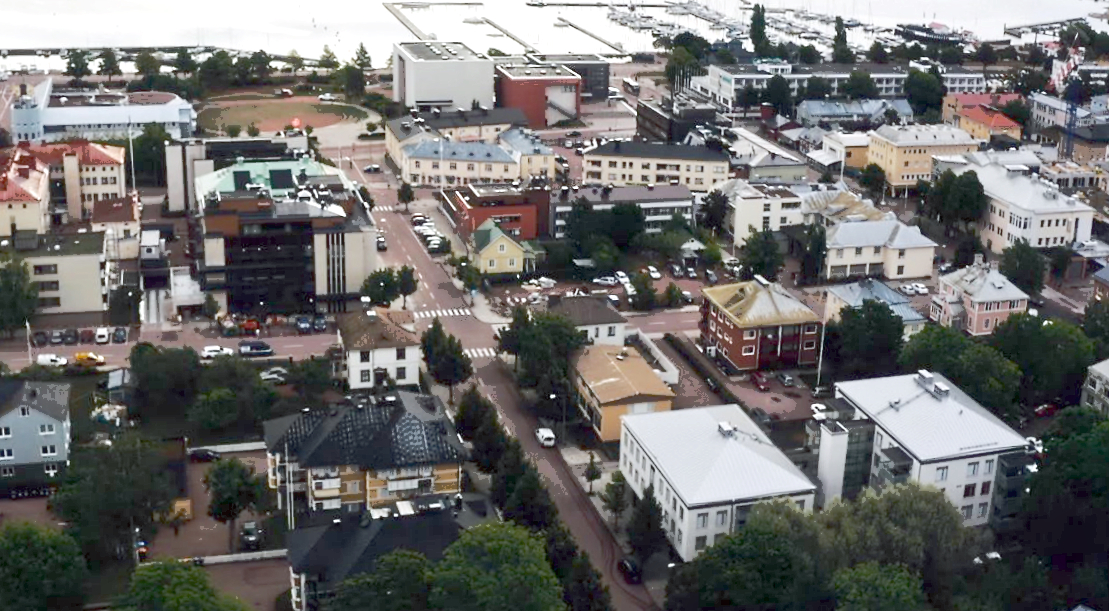
Central Mariehamn

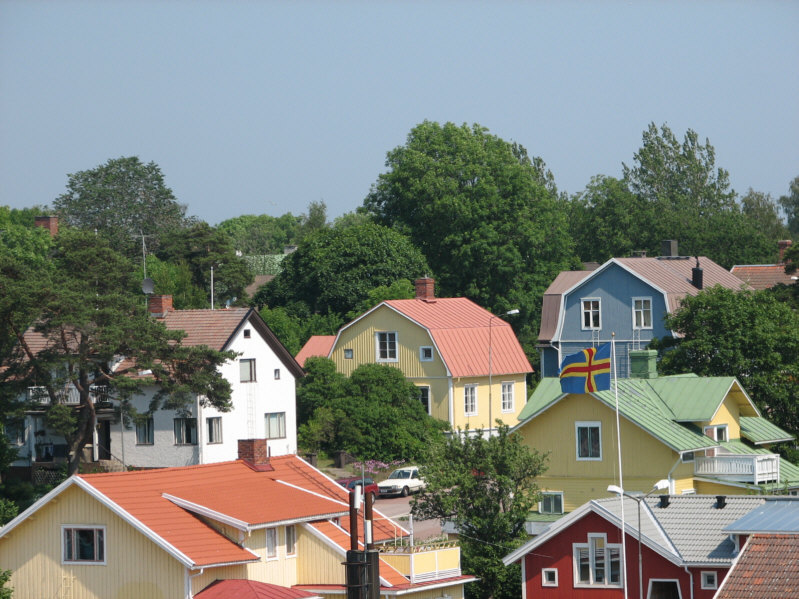
Wooden residential buildings in Mariehamn

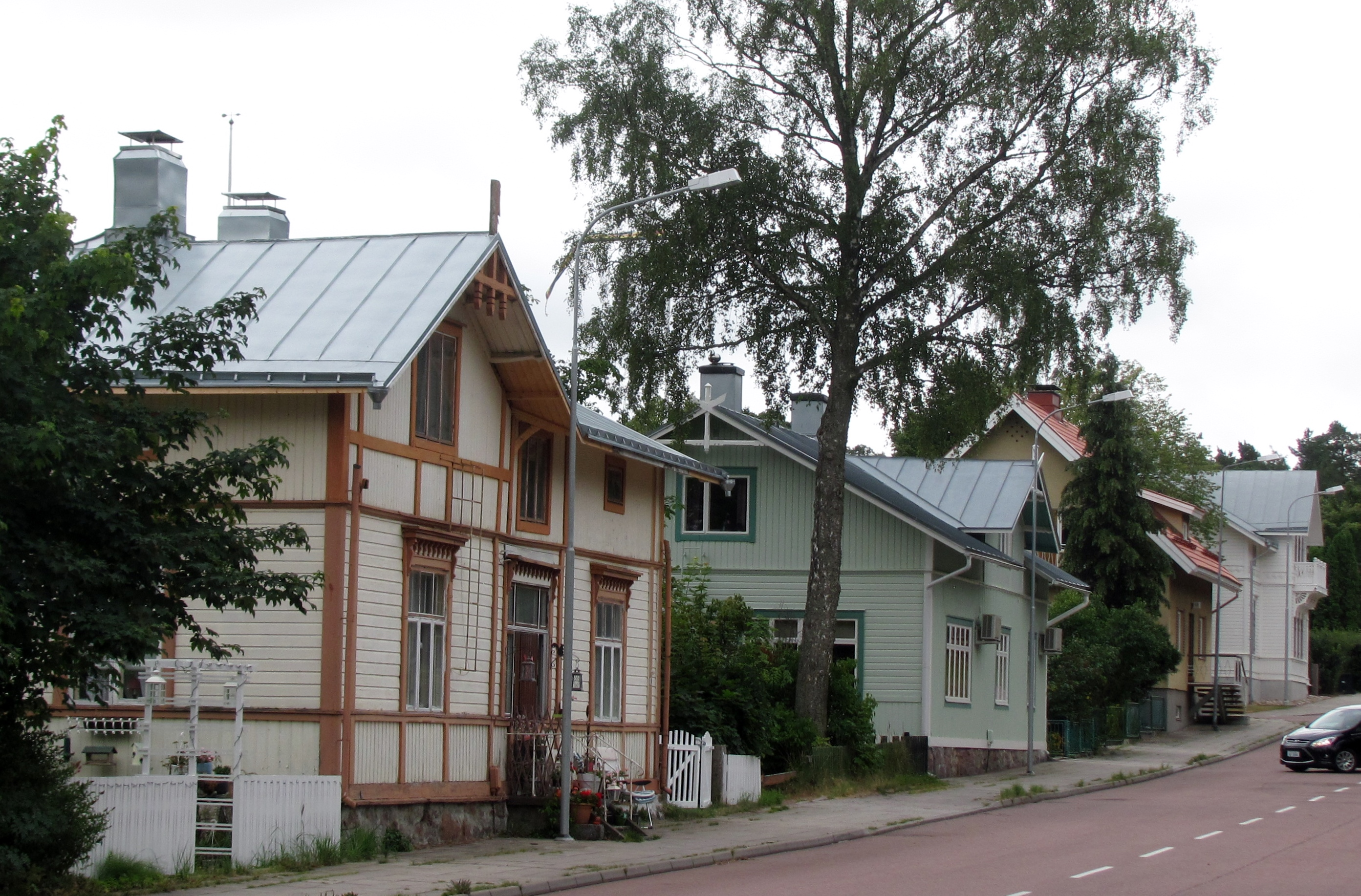
Södragatan

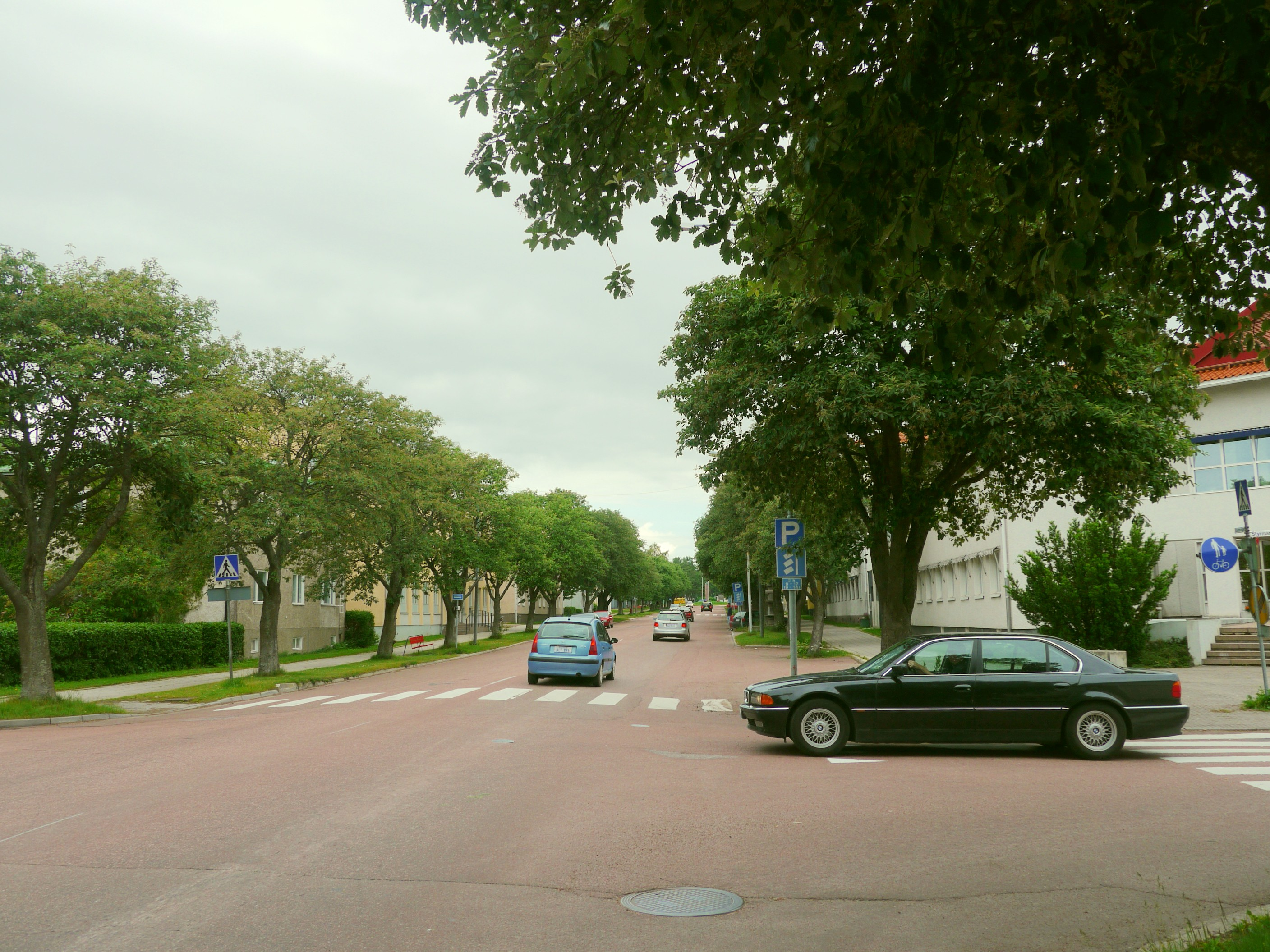
Ålandsvägen

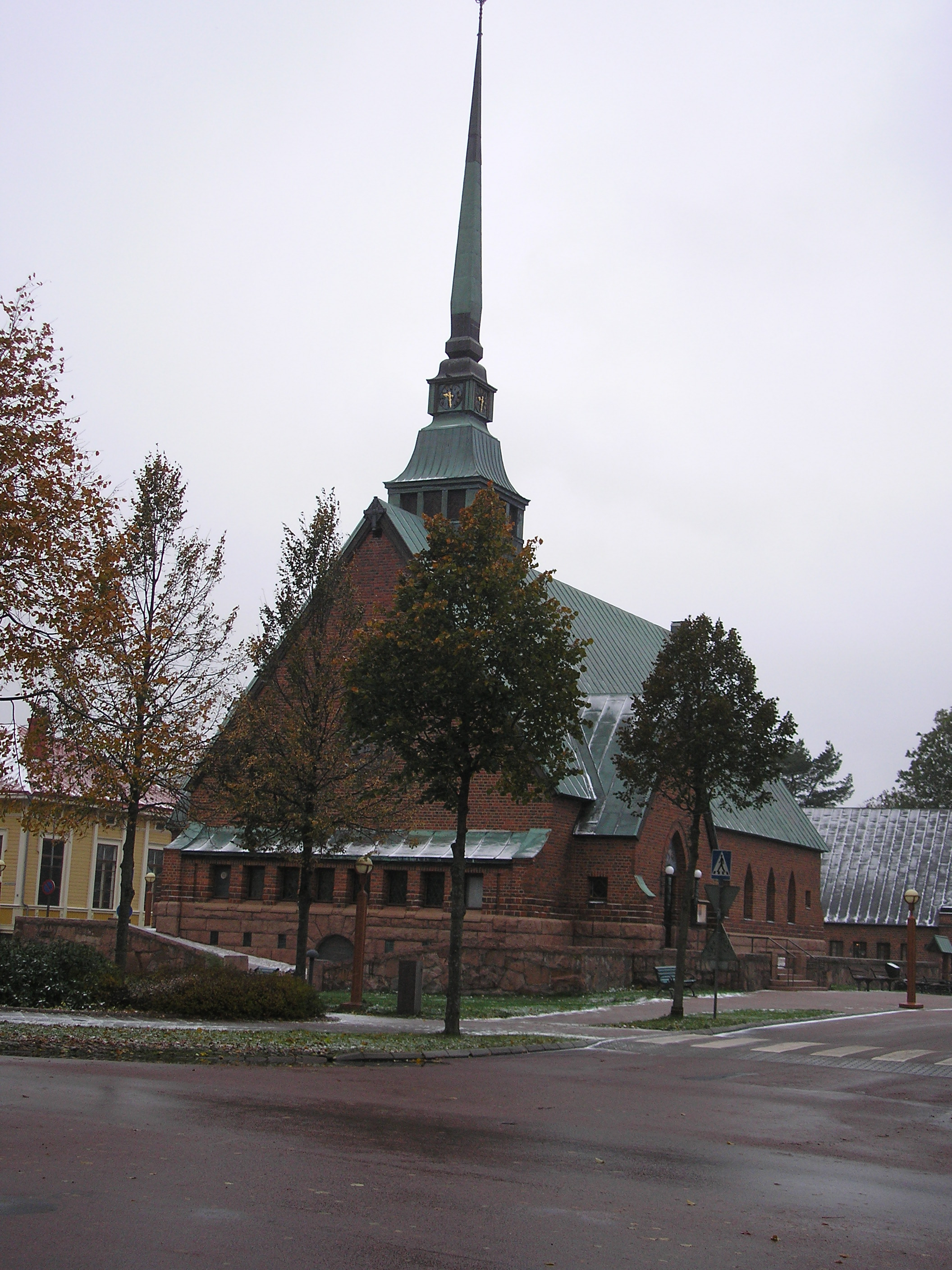
St. George's Church

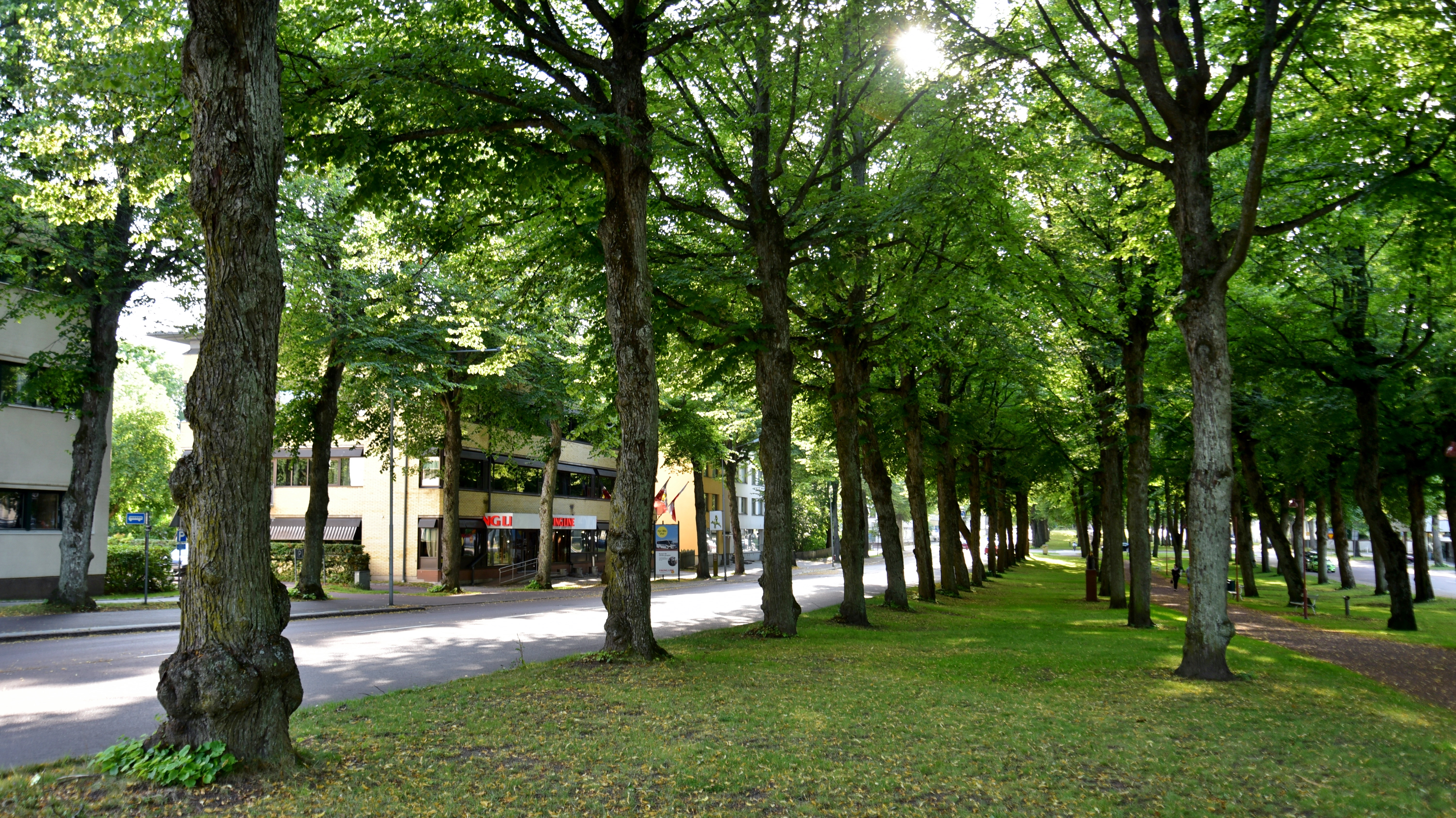
Esplanade along Storagatan

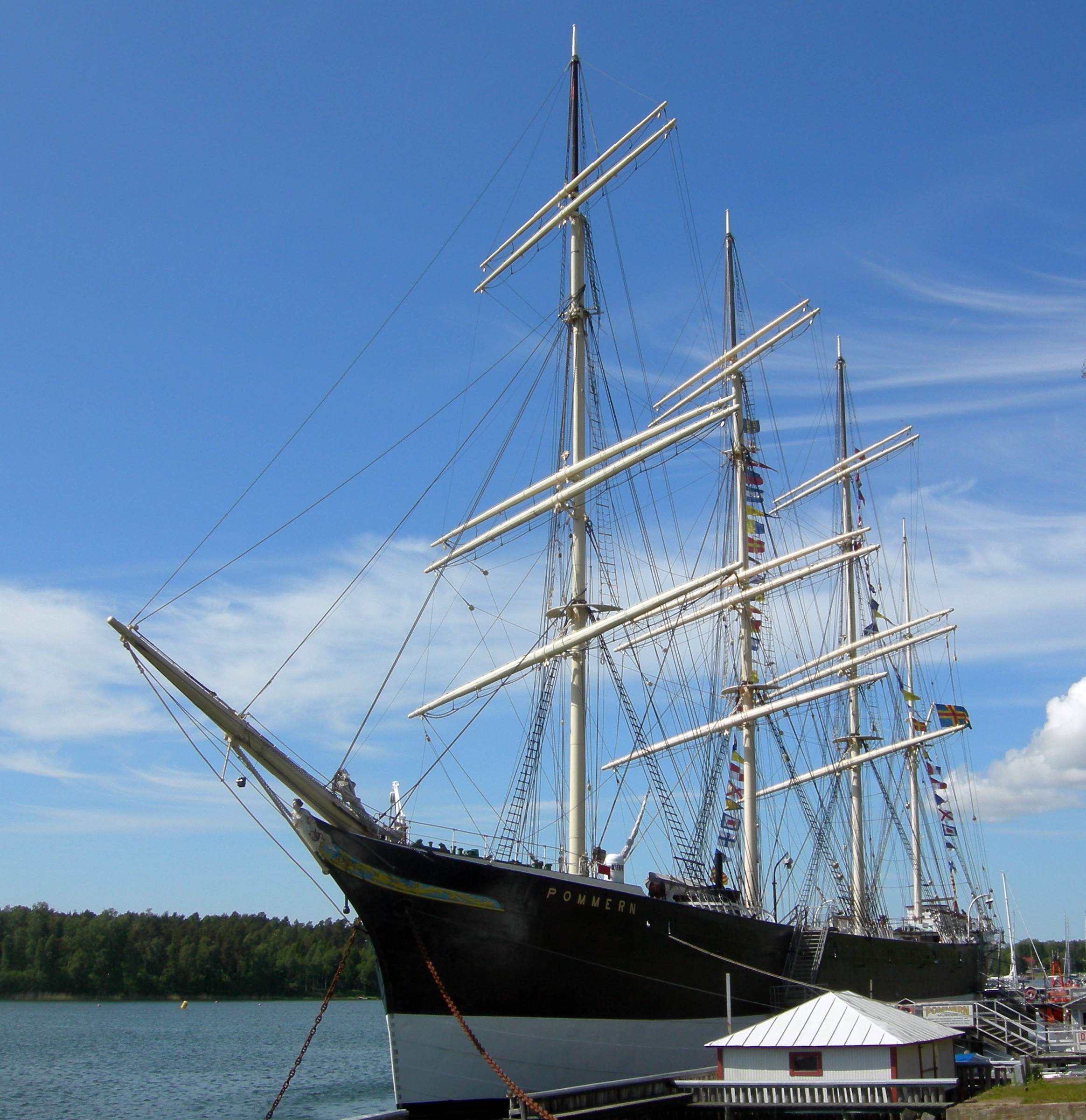
Museum ship Pommern

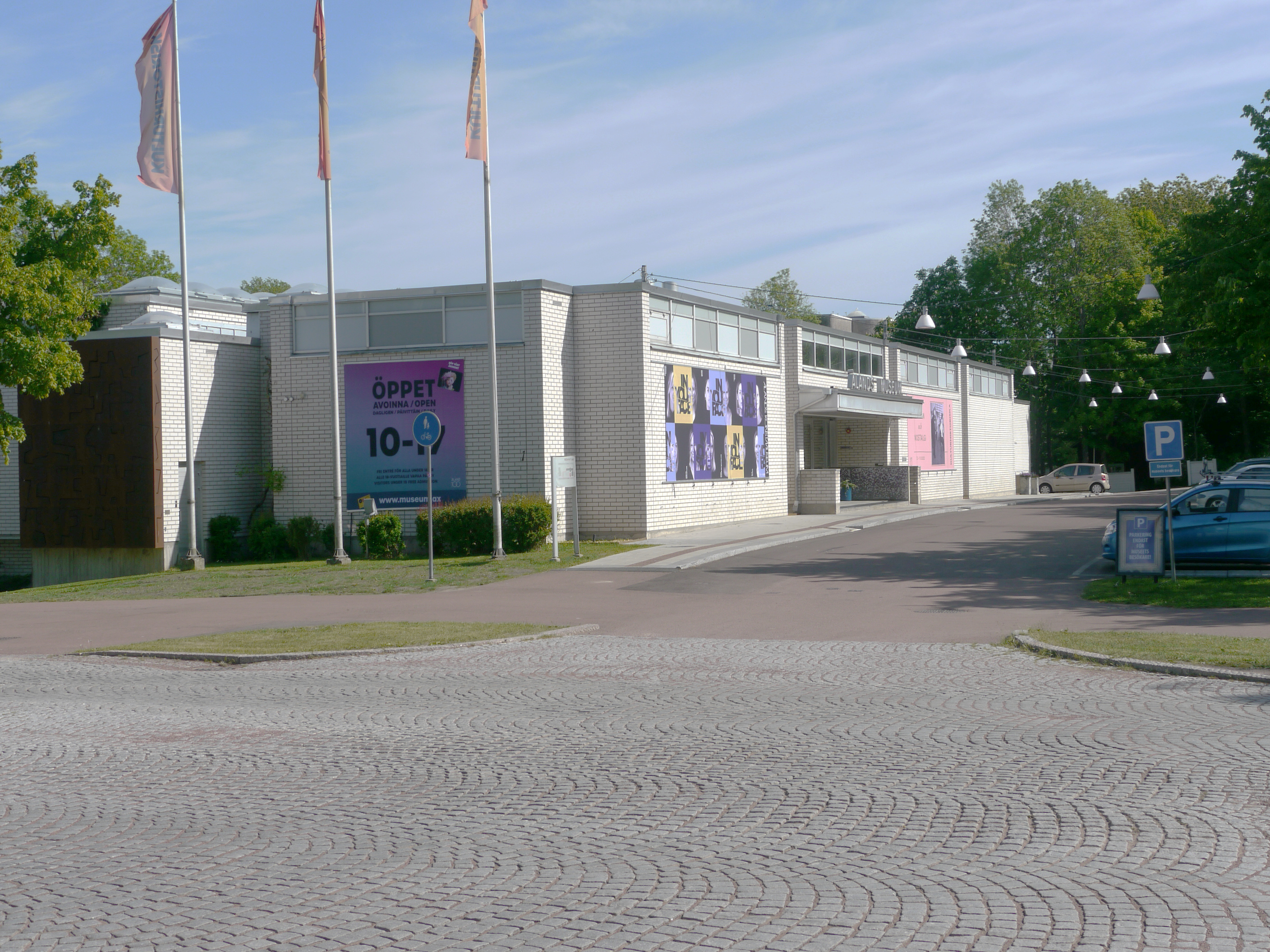
Åland Museum

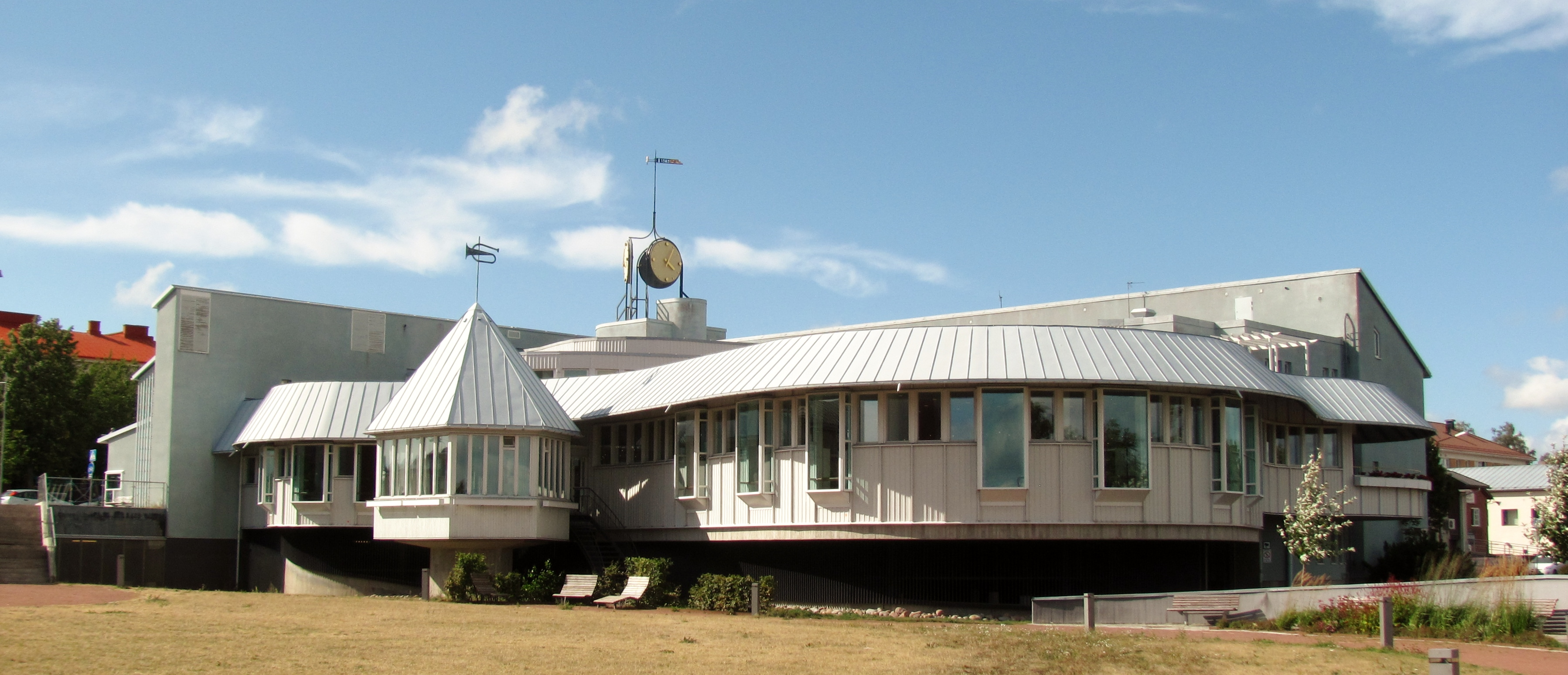
City library

Midsummer celebration in Mariehamn

== See also ==
- Godby
- Jomala
