= Johan Petersson =

Johan Petersson may refer to:

- Johan Petersson (handballer), Swedish handball player
- Johan Petersson (comedian), Swedish comedian, actor, television presenter and author

== See also ==
- Johan Pettersson (disambiguation)
