= F.P. von Knorring (ship) =

Floating restaurant in Åland

Coordinates: 60°5′55.68″N 19°56′52.32″E

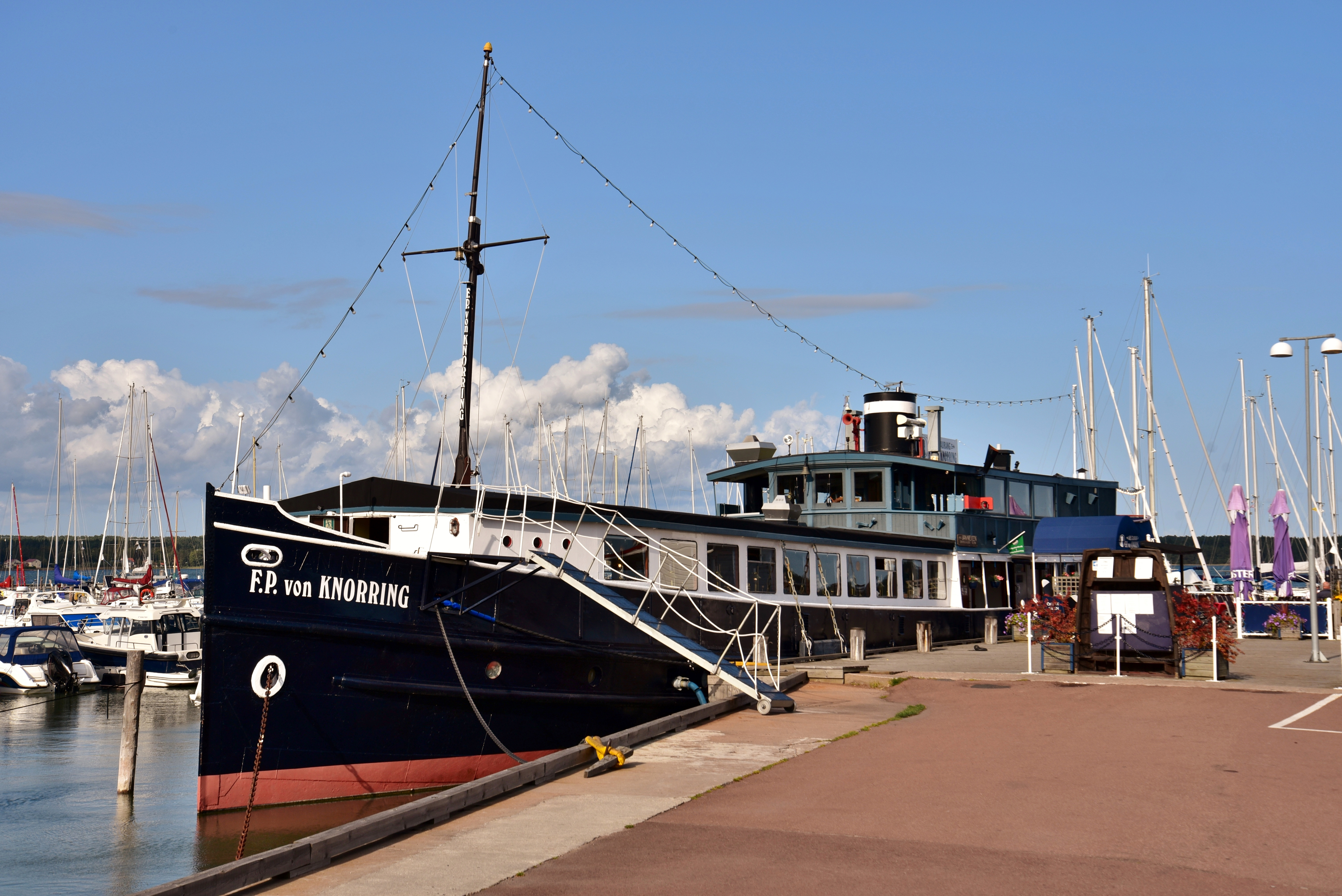
- F.P. von Knorring at the eastern harbour of Mariehamn, Åland, in 2019

History

Åland
- Name: Jan Nieveen (1928–1960); IJsselhaven (1960–1975); Wolga (1975–1977); Jan Nieveen (1977–1989); F.P. von Knorring (1989–present)
- Owner: Kim and Karin Harju-Jeanty
- Builder: Arnhemsche Scheepsbouw Maatschappij, Arnhem, the Netherlands
- Cost: ƒ140,000
- Laid down: 1927
- Launched: 1928
- Refit: 1951 (steam engine replaced with diesel engine)
- Status: Floating restaurant

General characteristics
- Tonnage: 128 GRT when built; Currently 83 GRT
- Length: 45.40 m (148 ft 11 in)
- Beam: 6.73 m (22 ft 1 in)
- Draught: As built 1.8 m (5 ft 11 in) when built; Currently 1.2 m (3 ft 11 in)
- Decks: 3
- Installed power: As built 260 hp (190 kW) steam when built; Currently 250 hp (190 kW) diesel
- Capacity: 300 passengers
- Notes: website: http://www.fpvonknorring.com/

F.P. von Knorring (originally Jan Nieveen) is a passenger ship which was built in 1928 in the Netherlands and has been in continuous use. The ship has been a floating restaurant since 1989. It is docked in Mariehamn, capital of the Finnish province of Åland. The ship was originally named after the beurtvaart captain Jan Nieveen, who transported goods and passengers from the city of Groningen to Lemmer.

== Construction ==
The steamboat Jan Nieveen was built in 1928 at the Arnhemsche Scheepsbouw Maatschappij shipyard in Arnhem, the Netherlands, at a then-high price of 140,000 Dutch guilders. It was ordered by the Groninger & Lemmer Stoomboot Maatschappij, a shipping line which had been founded in 1870 by the brothers Reint, Jan and Geert Nieveen. The ship was designed with the maximum size that could pass through the locks of Lemmer when fully loaded. It entered service as a scheduled passenger and freight beurtvaart connection on the Zuiderzee between Lemmer and Amsterdam. Jan Nieveen had four sister ships, and was the flagship of the fleet.

The shipping line was successful during the 1930s, but later declined. The Jan Nieveen was then used for recreational trips along the coast and to the islands of Schokland and Urk.

== Second World War ==
During the Second World War, the ship transported food from the northern Dutch provinces to Holland (in exchange for gold and silver) and horses, in accordance with the German occupiers. Jews, in hiding, were smuggled on the lower deck to the relative freedom of the north-eastern Netherlands.

=== Collision ===
During the night of 7–8 January 1945 (during the Dutch famine of 1944–45), the ship was involved in a collision near Urk with its sister ship Groningen IV from the same company. Fourteen passengers and crew on the Groningen IV drowned when the ship sank, trapped when the collision blocked the door. According to German regulations, the lights on both ships were dimmed except for small navigation lights. The Jan Nieveen was only slightly damaged.

== Post-war makeovers and renamings ==
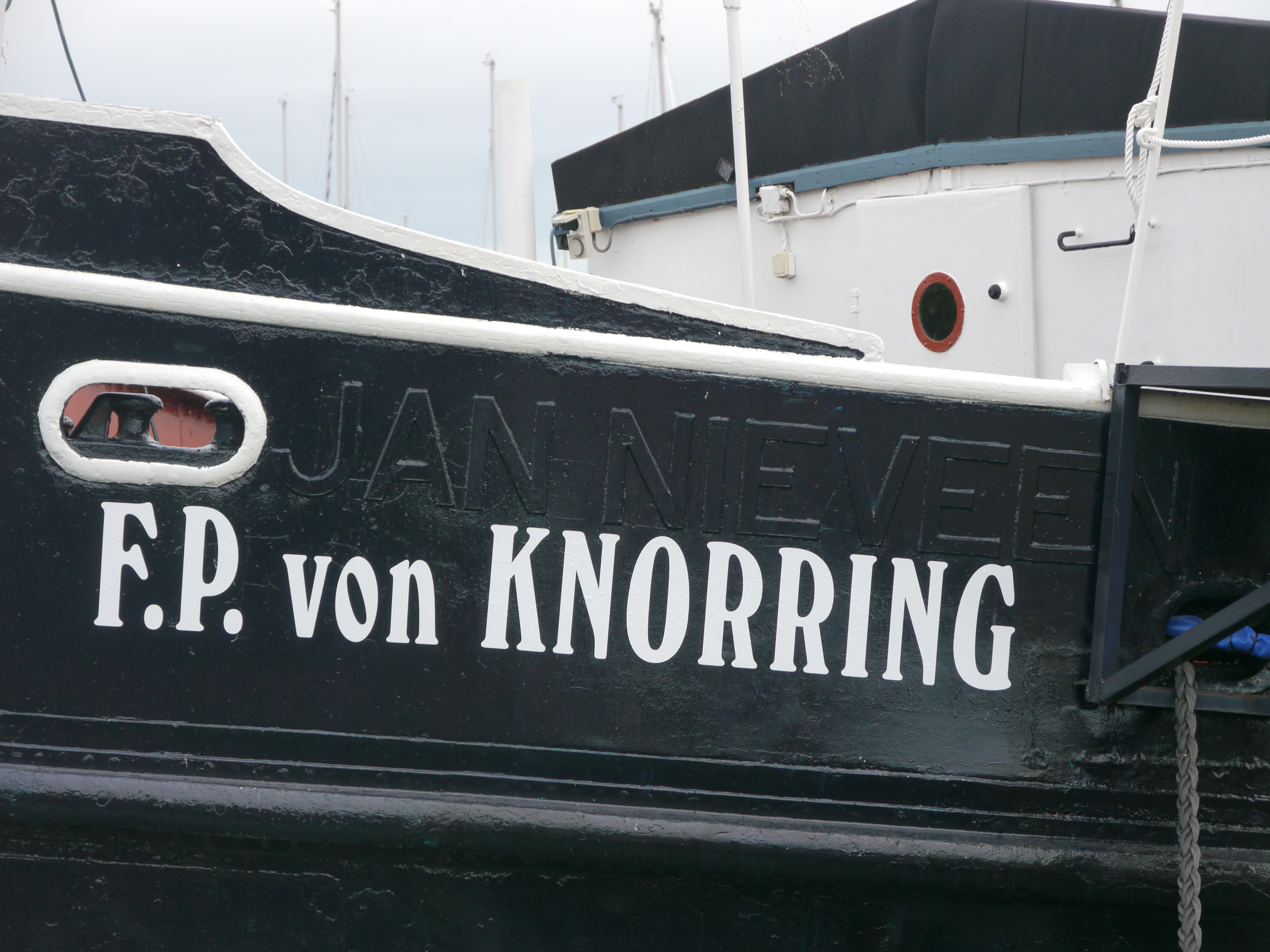
The ship's original name, Jan Nieveen, is still visible.

In 1951, the Jan Nieveen's heavy steam engine was replaced by a lighter diesel engine with almost the same power. The draught of the vessel diminished by 40 centimetres (16 in). An October 1953 merger of three beurtvaart companies created a fleet of 34 ships, managed by the J.H. van Swieten company. Jan Nieveen and its sister ship, Harm Nieveen', were the showpieces of the fleet. Increasing competition from road transport ended the beurtvaart era, and the Lemmer–Amsterdam route was discontinued in 1959.

In 1958, the ship was sold and underwent several modifications. It was a tourist boat in Rotterdam as the IJsselhaven from 1961 to 1974, and did the same for two seasons in Biesbosch National Park as the Wolga.

In 1977, the Nieveen family bought back the ship and renamed it Jan Nieveen. Its home port was Lemmer, from which it made day trips to harbours around the IJsselmeer. Ten years later, ship enthusiast Arthur Nikkessen of Amsterdam purchased the ship; he partially restored it and rented it out as a party boat.

== To Åland ==
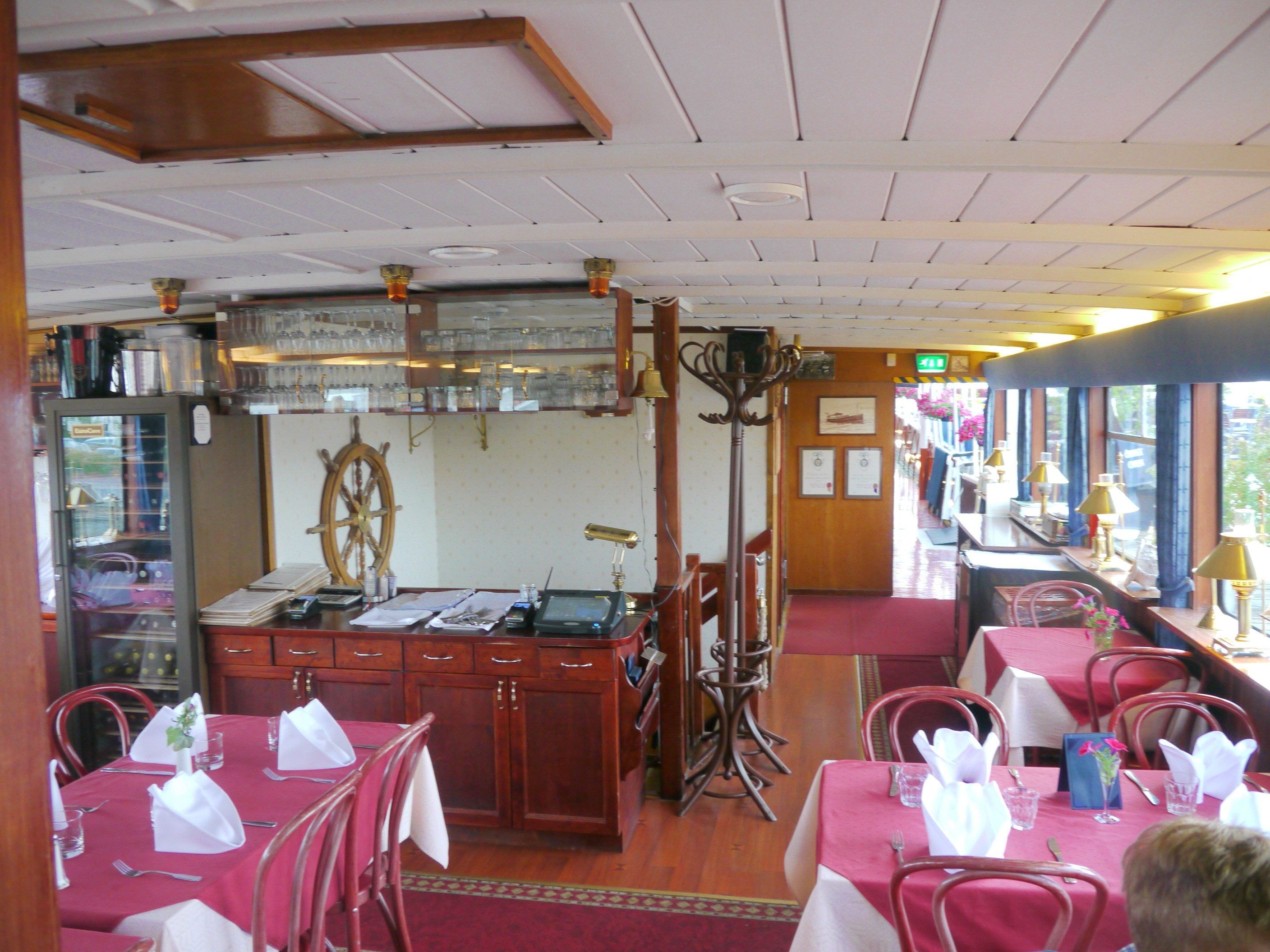
Restaurant interior, in the front of the ship

Two years later, the ship was sold to Dan Aalto and Ulf Danielsson of Åland in 1989. They converted the ship to a floating restaurant in the eastern harbour of Åland's capital, Mariehamn. The ship was renamed F.P. von Knorring after Frans Peter von Knorring (1792–1875), a vicar, teacher and founder of Åland's first schools and the islands' first newspaper. The restaurant was transferred to Kim and Karin Harju-Jeanty in 2002, and was still in operation in January 2019.
