= Karl Emanuel Jansson =

Finnish painter (1846–1874)

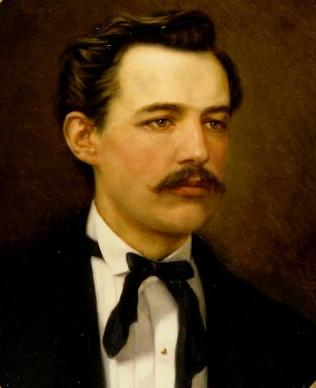
Karl Emanuel Jansson. Portrait by Fredrik Ahlstedt

Karl Emanuel Jansson (7 July 1846, in Finström – 1 June 1874, in Jomala) was a Finnish painter, primarily of genre scenes.

== Biography ==
His father worked as a farmer. His initial inspiration to pursue an artistic career came from the parish painter who was teaching him to read and write. After a year of apprenticeship with a shoemaker, he left to become the assistant to the painter. In 1859, the Vicar Frans von Knorring came across some of Jansson's drawings and sent them, along with a letter of recommendation, to the Finnish Art Society. This resulted in a scholarship for him to study at the Society's drawing school in Turku, overseen by Robert Wilhelm Ekman. Upon his arrival, Ekman helped arrange lodging and provided necessary art supplies.

In 1862, he relocated to Stockholm to continue his studies at the Royal Swedish Academy of Arts under Johan Fredrik Höckert. However, this period coincided with a slow economic time in Sweden, and he struggled to sell his works. Eventually, one of his paintings portraying the Prodigal Son was awarded a prize. In 1867, he completed his studies and received a state scholarship to study at the Kunstakademie Düsseldorf under Benjamin Vautier. This period greatly influenced his artistic style. He continued attending classes there until 1872, often returning to his hometown of Finström in between.

During this time, he was diagnosed with tuberculosis and traveled to Rome in search of a more favorable climate for his health. Finding little relief, he sought different health resorts, including Davos and Merano, with no notable improvement. After completing his affairs in Düsseldorf, he returned home for what would be his final stay.

Back home, he resided in Jomala with a local judge and his wife, who cared for him. On his deathbed, he received news that he had been accepted as an associate member of the Imperial Academy of Arts.

== Selected paintings ==
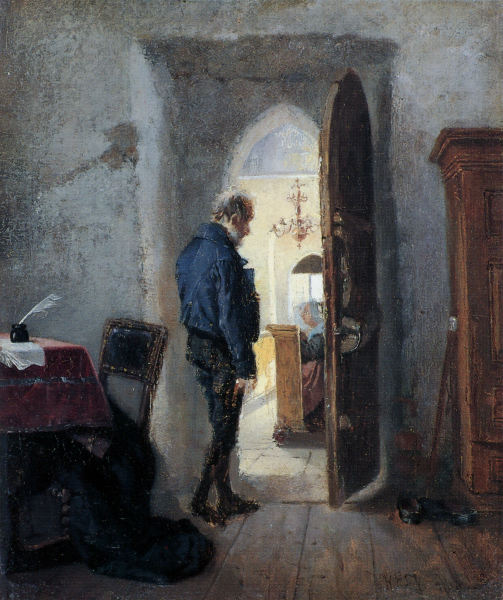
An Old Sexton (1874)

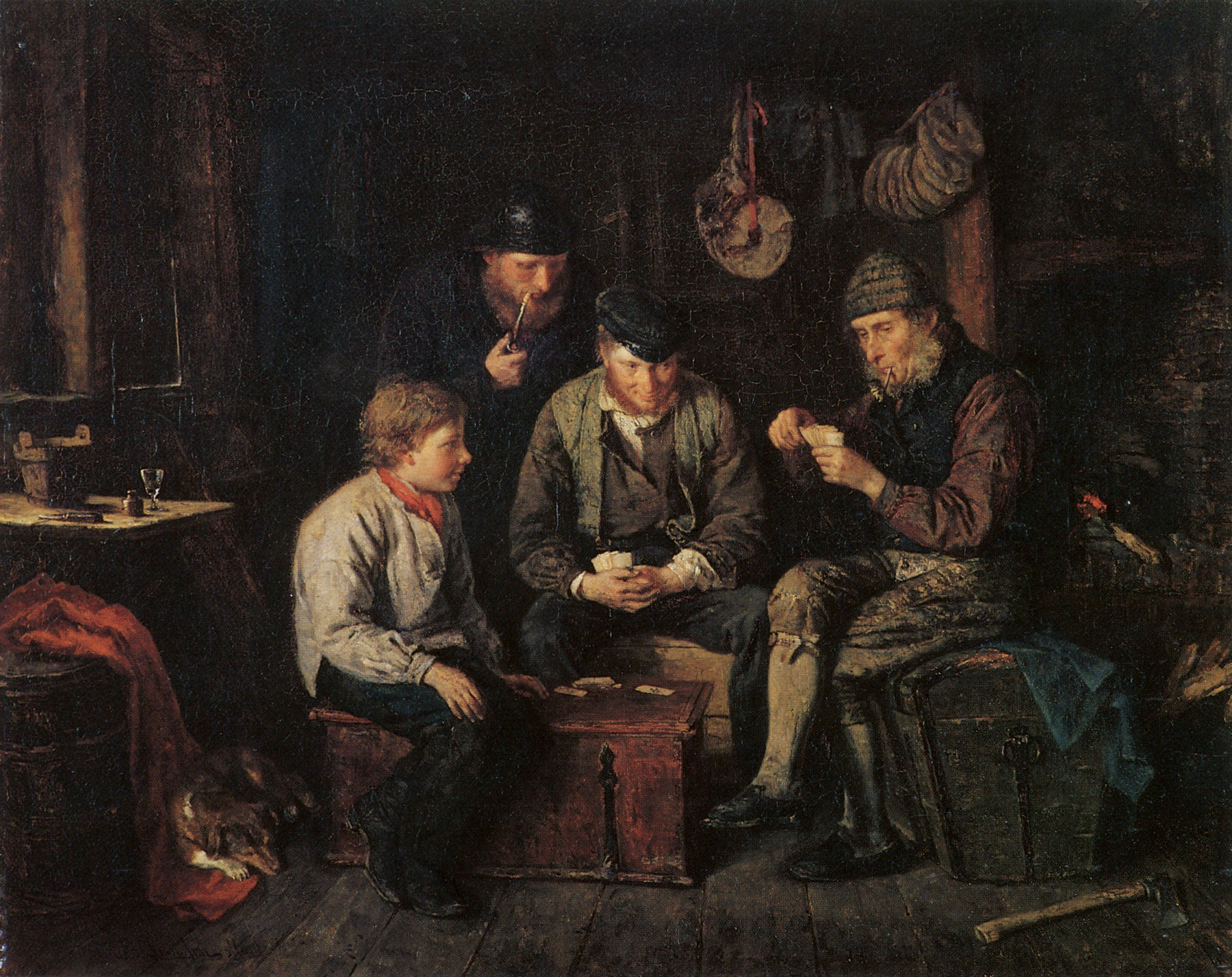
Sailors Playing Cards (1871)

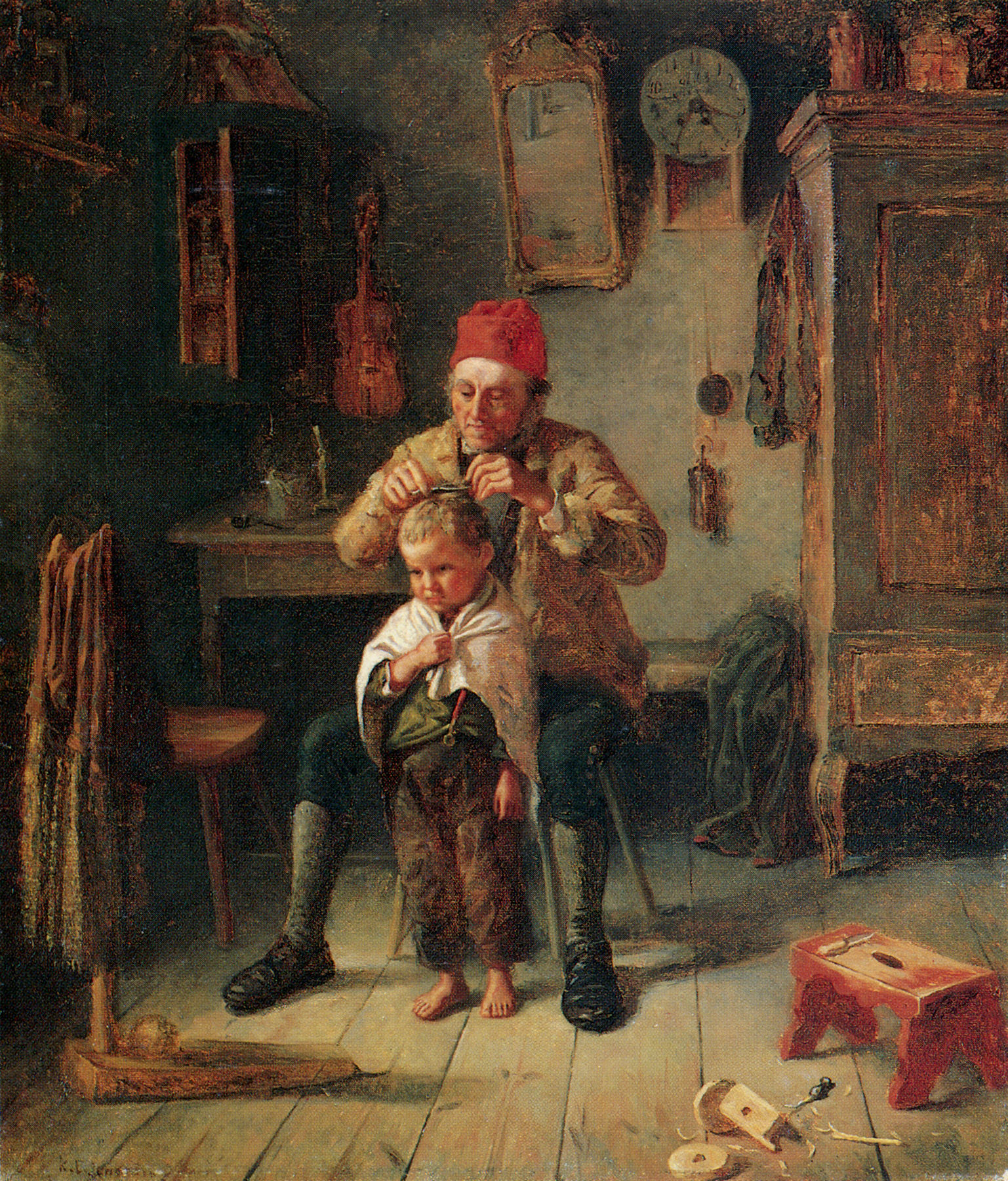
The Haircut (1867)

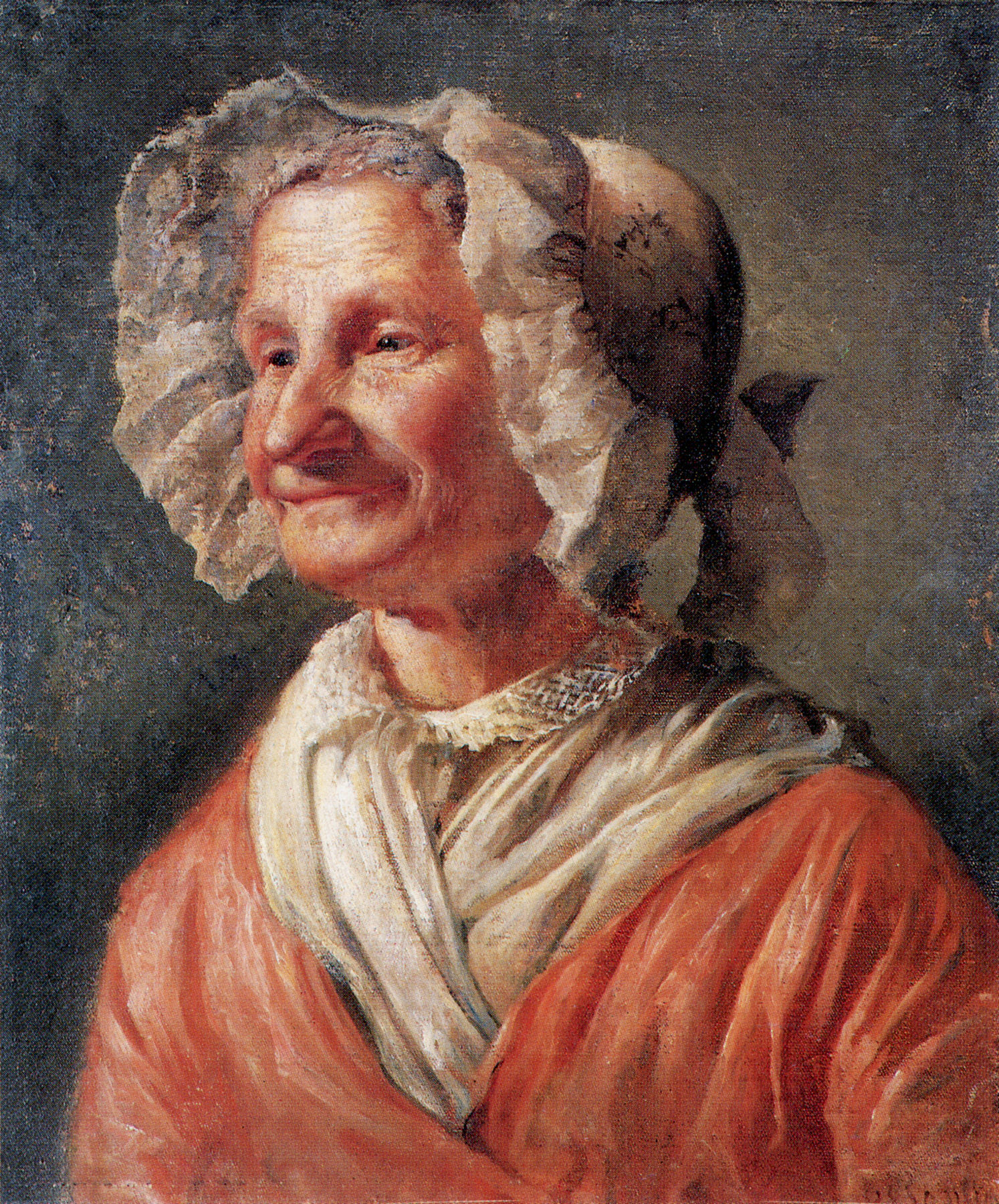
Woman in a White Bonnet (1867)
