= Simon Petersson =

Swedish ice hockey player

- Born: March 21, 1993 (age 32) Vimmerby, Sweden
- Height: 6 ft 0 in (183 cm)
- Weight: 185 lb (84 kg; 13 st 3 lb)
- Position: Defence
- Shoots: Left
- Elitserien team: HV71
- NHL draft: Undrafted
- Playing career: 2010–present

Simon Petersson (born March 21, 1993) is a Swedish ice hockey defenceman. He made his Elitserien debut playing with HV71 during the 2012–13 Elitserien season.
