= Johan Pettersson =

Johan Pettersson may refer to:

- Johan Pettersson (athlete) (1884–1952), Finnish Olympic track and field athlete
- Johan Pettersson (footballer, born 1980), Swedish footballer
- Johan Pettersson (footballer, born 1989), Dutch-born Swedish footballer

== See also ==
- Johan Petersson (disambiguation)
