= Kjell-Ronnie Pettersson =

Swedish ice hockey player

- Born: March 25, 1943 (age 83) Ljungby, Seden
- Position: Left wing
- Shot: Left
- Played for: Västra Frölunda IF
- Playing career: 1959–1980

Kjell-Ronnie Pettersson (born 25 March 1943, in Ljungby, Sweden) is a retired Swedish ice hockey player. He spent the majority of his career with Västra Frölunda IF.
