= Frans Peter von Knorring =

Aland Islands vicar (1792–1875)

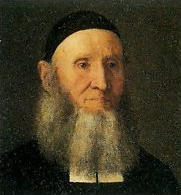
- Born: 6 October 1792; Kokemäki
- Died: 29 March 1875 (aged 82)
- Occupations: Pastor; Scribe; Social reformer

Frans Peter von Knorring (6 October 1792, Kokemäki - 29 March 1875) was a pastor, scribe and social reformer in Åland.

== Biography ==
von Knorring was born on October 6, 1792 in Kokemäki. In the years 1810–1818, he studied at several universities, Turku, Uppsala and Dorpat, and acquired knowledge in theological subjects, in mathematics, astronomy and oriental languages.

He was the vicar of Finström from 1834 to 1875 and he organized the educational system in Åland. He started an elementary school at Godby in 1853. The school's syllabus included subjects related to farming.

A versatile man who published books on many subjects, such as linguistics, geography, pedagogy and economics, he also founded the first newspaper on Åland in 1868.

He died on 29 March 1875.

== Legacy ==
Two statues have been raised in his honour, one in Mariehamn and one at the church of Finström.
