= Åland Maritime Museum =

- Ålands sjöfartsmuseum
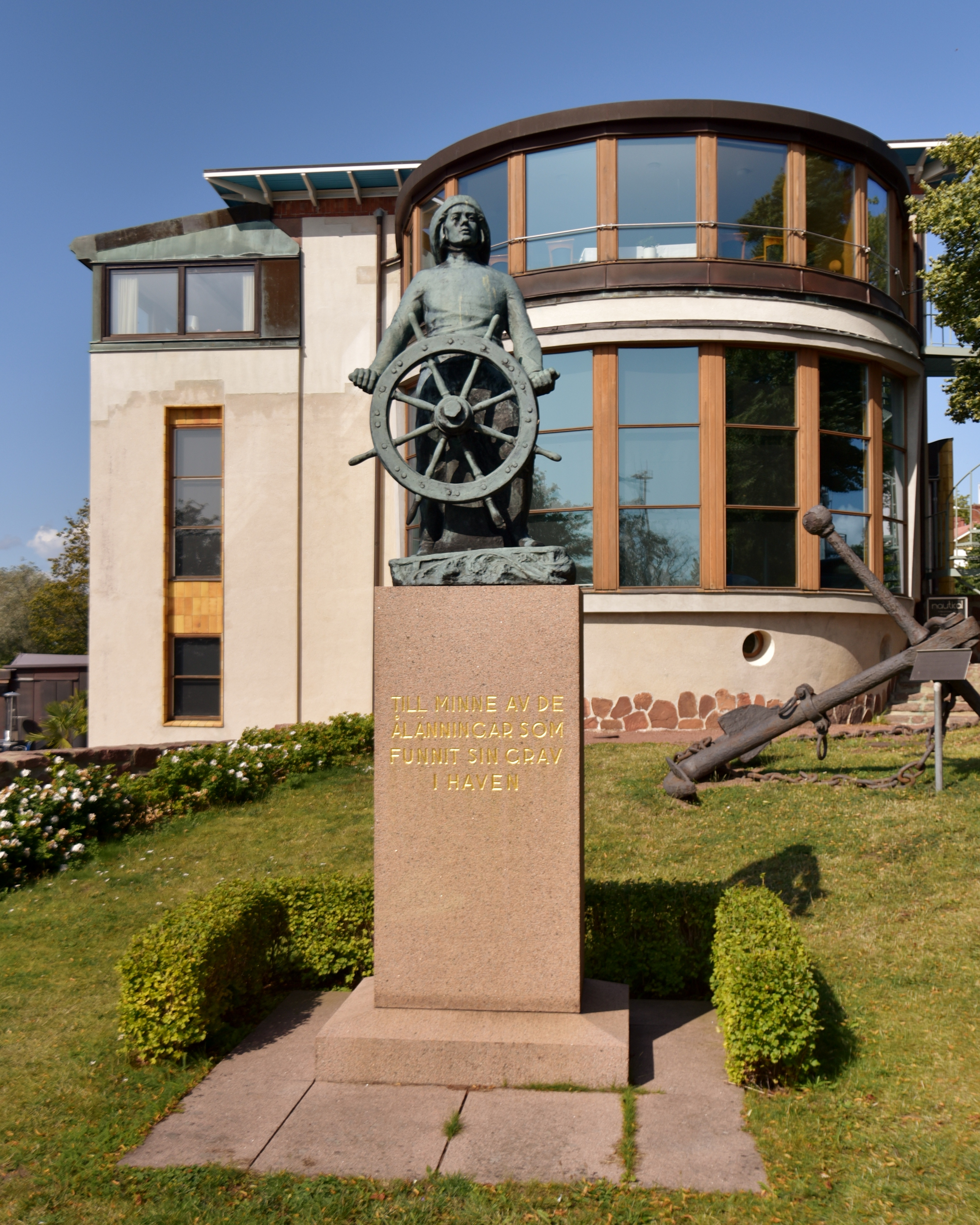

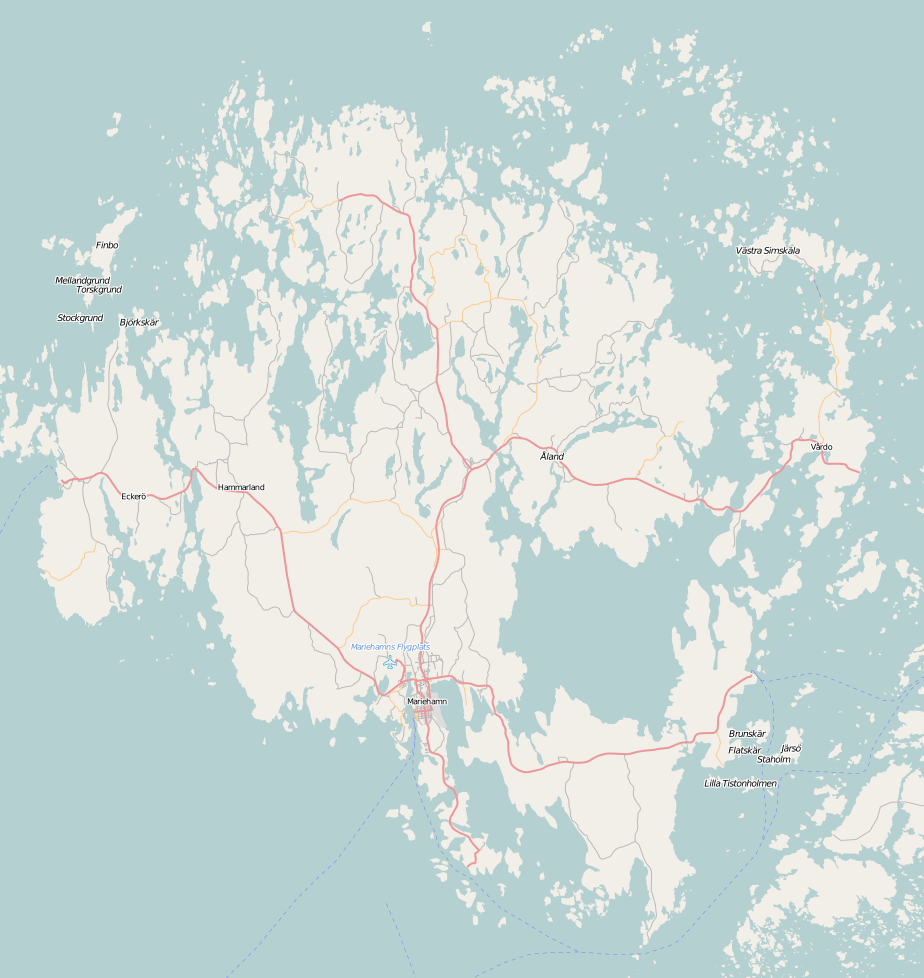
- Location in Åland
- Established: 1954
- Location: Mariehamn, Åland Islands, Finland
- Coordinates: 60.096944°N 19.926389°E
- Type: Maritime museum
- Director: Hanna Hagmark-Cooper
- Website: Museum website

The Åland Maritime Museum (Swedish: Ålands sjöfartsmuseum) is a museum in Mariehamn in Åland, Finland. It is located in the western part of the town on the sea on Hamngatan, about 1 km (0.62 mi) at the other end of Storagatan. Along with Ålands Museum, it is the most important museum in the islands and a monument to the history of Åland as holder of the world's largest fleet of wooden sailing ships. The foremost exhibit is a four-masted barque named Pommern, built in Glasgow in 1903, which is anchored behind the museum. The museum designed building is built like a ship's prow cutting into the land. It has been called the "kitsch museum of fishing and maritime commerce."

== Museum layout ==
The Åland Maritime Museum is considered one of the world's finest museums related to merchant sailing ships. The building is laid out on two floors with objects relevant to the past glory of the shipping era. The museum has a library wing which has a large collection of books and photos. Souvenirs of books and picture post cards are available in the museum shop.

== Exhibits in the museum ==
The museum created the central core of a ship depicting a mast, saloon, galley and cabins. The ships figureheads are on display along with the boats; the prominent figurehead displayed, a male figure, once decorated the ship, the "California". In addition, nautical trappings, a number of ships in bottles and sea chests are also on display. Paintings of ships (docked either in Hull, Antwerp, Hong Kong or elsewhere), done by local artists who were specially commissioned by the captain of every ship, are exhibited in the museum. Models of ships of different time periods are displayed on a uniform scale so that the difference between a Baltic schooner and an ocean-going windjammer could be easily discerned. The Åland Maritime Museum also has one of the only authentic Jolly Roger pirate flags in the world.

== Pommern museum ship ==
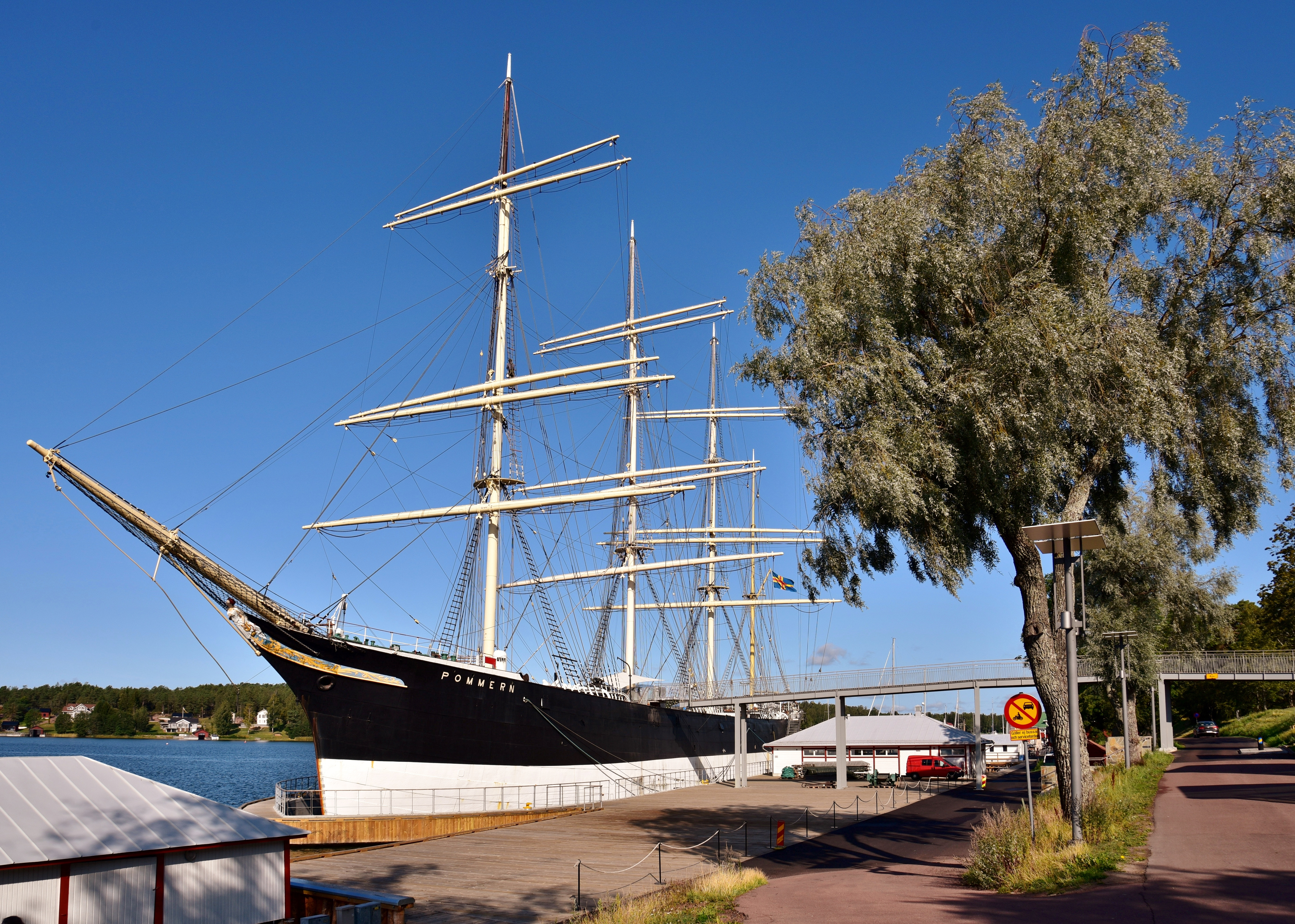
The museum ship Pommern at Åland

The museum ship, Pommern, a four-masted merchant barque and windjammer which regularly operated on the grain trade route between Australia and England during the interwar years, is now anchored behind the museum as a display. This is considered as the symbol of Mariehamn, the capital of Åland. It is very well preserved.

It was launched in 1903 in Glasgow, Scotland, under the name Mneme, and was later renamed Pommern. Gustaf Erikson bought the ship in 1929. With a 26-member crew, it carried several tonnes of merchandise (mostly wheat during World War II). It won the grain race twice in the 1930s, and completed the route under 100 days at least four times. It has a record for running for 110 days at a stretch.

It is the centrepiece of the museum since 1957 at its present mooring in the western harbour of Mariehamn, after sailing for over 70 years. Cabinets in the museum display curios collected by the sailors from different lands; including piranhas and sharks’ jaws, shells and corals. A unique display is a "Jolly Roger" pirate's flag which is one of a kind.

== See also ==
- Western Harbour (Mariehamn)
