= Pommern (ship) =

Iron-hulled sailing ship

Coordinates: 60°05′50″N 019°55′31″E

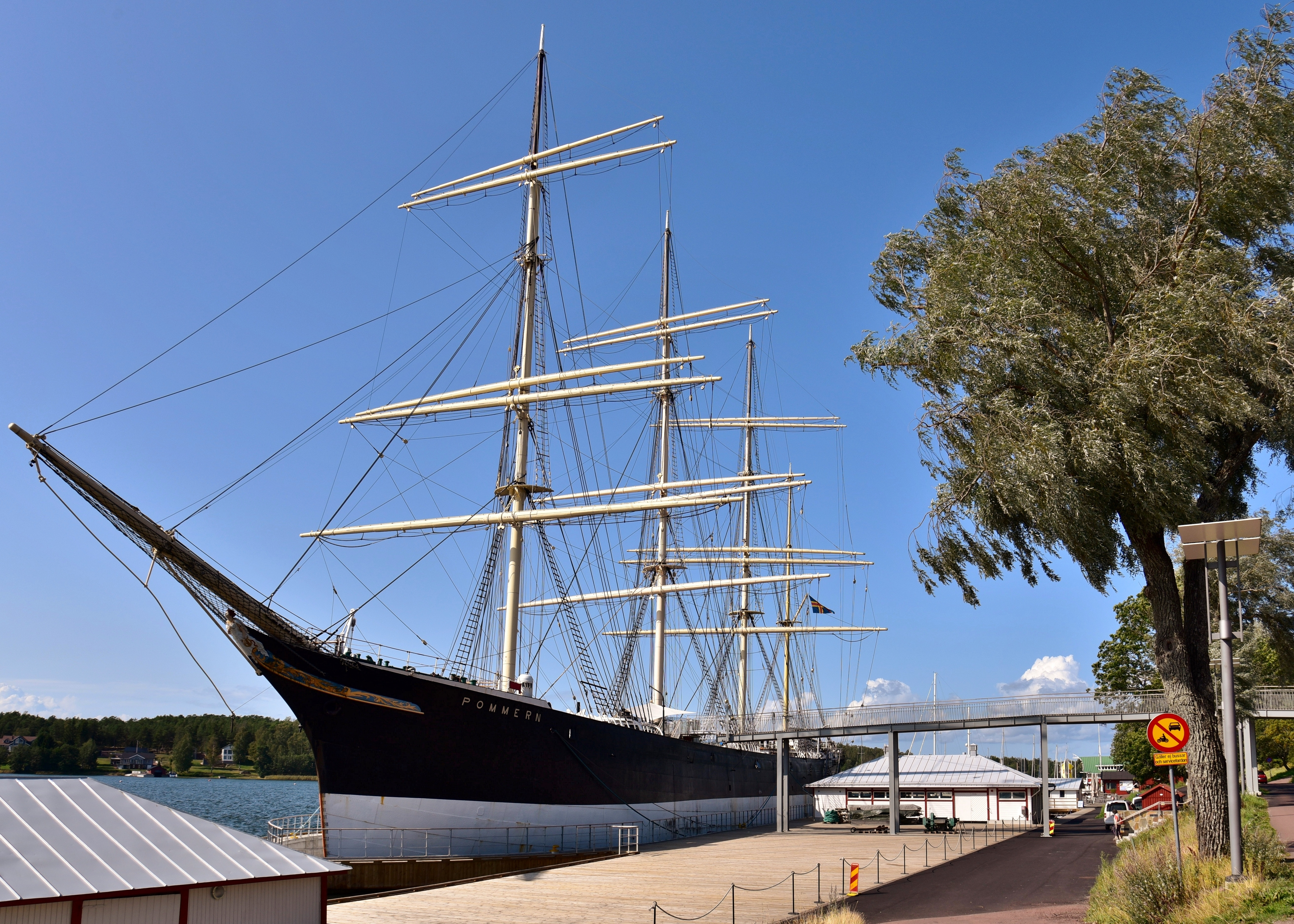
- Pommern at Mariehamn, Finland, in 2019

History

Åland
- Name: Mneme (1903-08); Pommern (since 1908)
- Owner: F Laeisz; G Erikson; Municipality of Mariehamn
- Builder: J Reid & Co
- Launched: 31 January 1903
- Status: Museum ship

General characteristics
- Type: Four-masted steel barque
- Tonnage: 2,376 GRT; 2,114 NRT
- Length: 95 m (311 ft 8 in)
- Beam: 13 m (42 ft 8 in)
- Draught: 7.5 m (24 ft 7 in)
- Propulsion: Sails, 3,420 m^{2} (36,800 sq ft)
- Sail plan: Barque
- Complement: 26

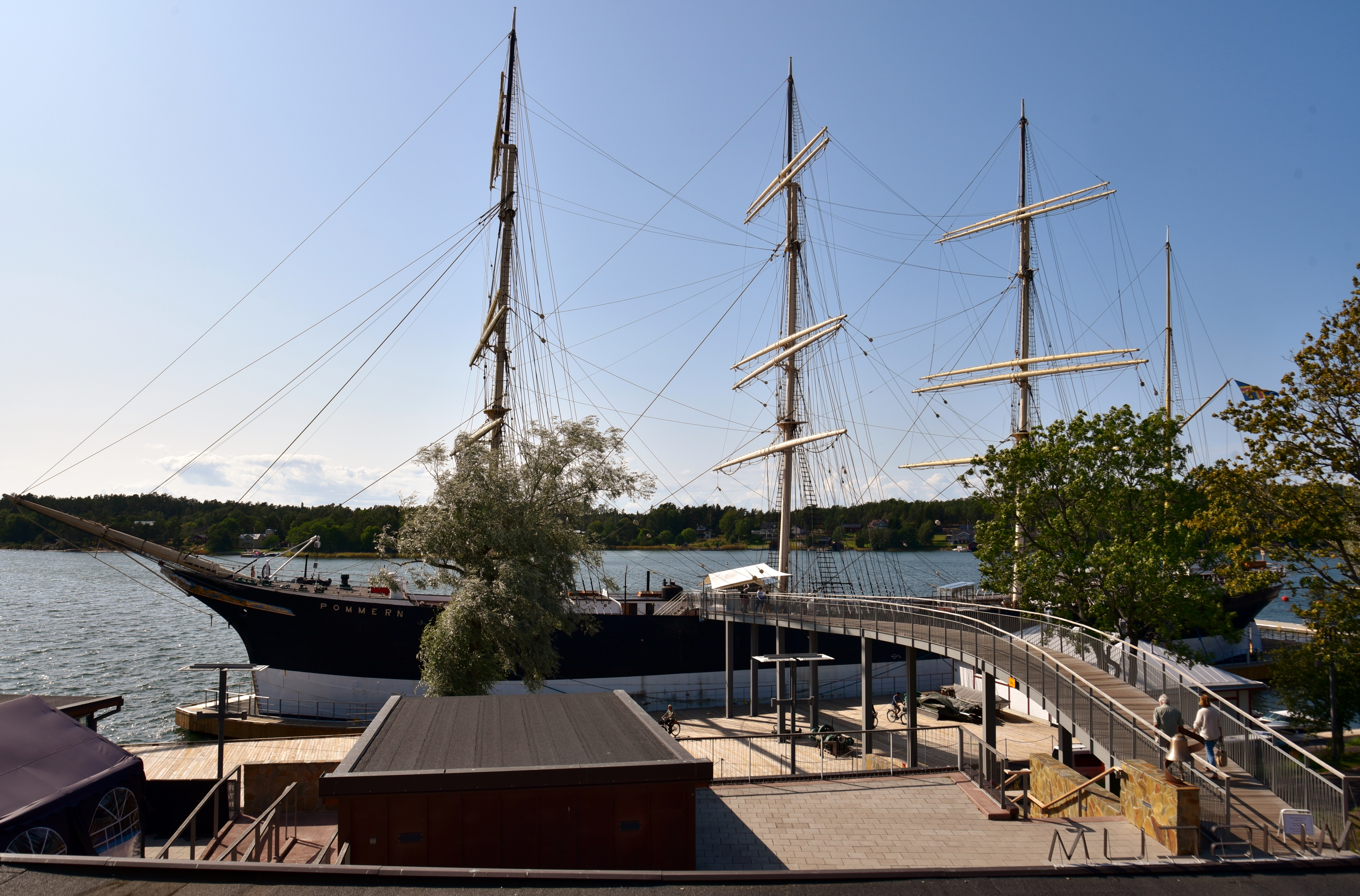
Pommern, anchored in the western of Mariehamn's two harbours, Västerhamn

Pommern, formerly Mneme (1903–1908), is a steel-hulled four-masted barque. It was built in 1903 at the J. Reid & Co shipyard in Glasgow, Scotland.

Pommern (German for Pomerania) is one of the Flying P-Liners, sailing ships of the German shipping company F. Laeisz. In 1921 the Pommern had to be handed over to Greece as war reparation. In 1923 she was acquired by Gustaf Erikson of Mariehamn in the Finnish Åland archipelago, who used her to carry grain from the Spencer Gulf area in Australia to harbours in England or Ireland until the start of World War II.

On 2 March 1935, Pommern ran aground at Port Germein, South Australia, but she was refloated and returned to service.

After World War II, Pommern was donated to the town of Mariehamn as a museum ship. It is now a museum ship belonging to the Åland Maritime Museum and is anchored in western Mariehamn, Åland. A collection of photographs taken by Ordinary Seaman Peter Karney in 1933 showing dramatic pictures of life on a sailing ship rounding Cape Horn can be found in the National Maritime Museum at Greenwich.

A 1:35-scale model of Pommern hangs in Grundtvigs Kirke, in Copenhagen, Denmark, though on being donated to the church in 1939, the model was renamed Dronning Alexandrine in honour of Denmark's then- queen consort.

Pommern is so-called "bald-headed barque": it does not have royals over her upper topgallant sails. The topsails and topgallant sails have been divided in two (upper and lower) to ease their handling.

Pommern has the reputation of being a "lucky ship". She survived both world wars unscathed, lost only four crew members at sea on her journeys, and won the Great Grain Races twice, 1930 and 1937. "Pommern" is thus one of the most popular landmarks of Åland, and is visited by thousands of visitors annually.

In 2019 Pommern was placed in a purpose-built dock facility that can be pumped dry for periodic maintenance of the ship's hull.

== Technical details ==
- Structure: Built of steel
- Sail plan: 4 masted barque
- Length: 95 m (312 ft)
- Width: 13 m (43 ft)
- Draft: 7.5 m (25 ft)
- Gross register tonnage: 2376
- Net register tonnage: 2114
- Cargo: 4,050 t (3,990 long tons; 4,460 short tons)
- Height of main mast: 50 m (160 ft)
- Total area of sails: 3,240 m^{2} (34,900 sq ft)
- Area of square sails: 2,450 m^{2} (26,400 sq ft)
- Crew: 26

== See also ==
- af Chapman (ship)
- Kruzenshtern (ship)
- Moshulu
- Passat (ship)
- Pamir (ship)
- Peking (ship)
