= Joel Pettersson =

Finnish writer (1892–1937)

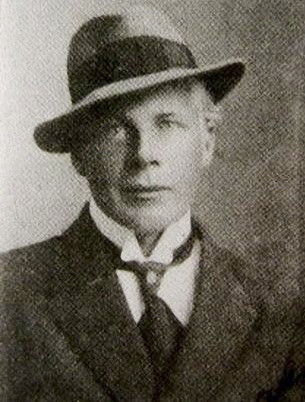
- Portrait of Pettersson (c. 1916)
- Born: June 8, 1892
- Died: January 5, 1937 (aged 44)
- Education: Åbo Ritskola, Turku
- Known for: Writings

Joel Pettersson (8 June 1892 – 5 January 1937) was a painter and writer on the Åland Islands, Finland. He remained an obscure figure during his lifetime; most of his writings were unpublished for decades after his death.

== Biography ==
Petterssons parents were elderly peasants, Joel's father being over 50 at the time of Joel's birth. Joel had a younger brother Karl, who died at sea in 1916. Pettersson lived almost his entire life in Norrby Lemland, Åland.

He had to take over the family farm although he lacked both interest and qualifications for farming.

Pettersson began writing and painting in his early school years, though few of his works from this period were preserved.

From around 1913 he studied at the drawing school Åbo Ritskola in Turku He stayed in Turku until 1915, when he decided to abort his studies and return to Åland. He painted actively for a few years after the art school.

Upon his return, Pettersson became active in the local youth organisation, for which he wrote plays and monologues. He directed plays, made scene set-ups, costumes and marionette dolls. He also wrote prose which he read out loud during meetings. Pettersson was most active as a writer following his return from Turku until 1921.

During the 1920s, Pettersson worked mostly on his parents' farm, only sporadically participating in the youth organisation's activities. His parents both died in 1928, leaving Pettersson to care for the farm. He sold all the animals and most of the property. He tried earning a living on art, but was unsuccessful. He then tried raising hens, but this also proved to be an unsuccessful venture. He resumed painting in 1935, and some of his paintings were displayed during an exhibition the following year.

His constant economic difficulties and work load took their toll. In 1936, he suffered a nervous breakdown and was committed to Grelsby Asylum, where he remained until his death in early 1937.

Pettersson never married, although he was engaged for a brief period; his fiancée left for America. There is some speculation that Pettersson may have been bisexual.

== Gallery ==
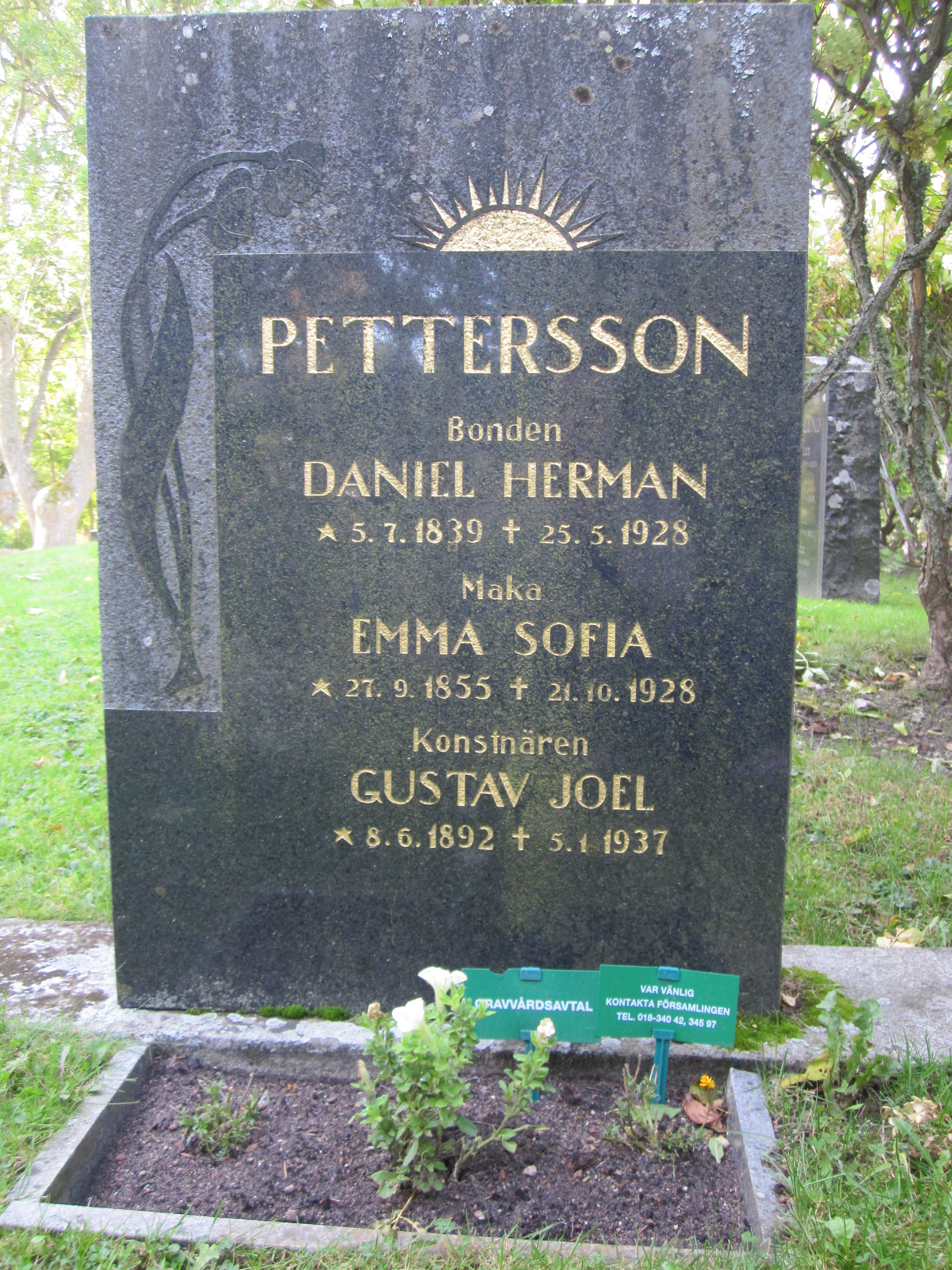

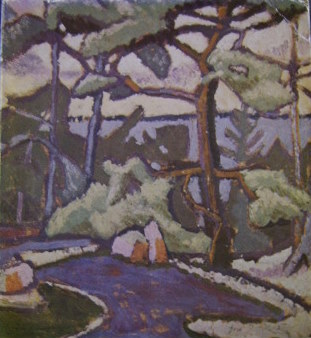

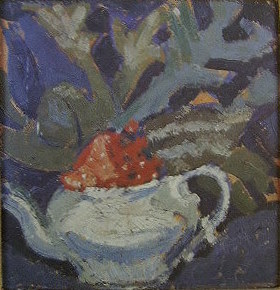

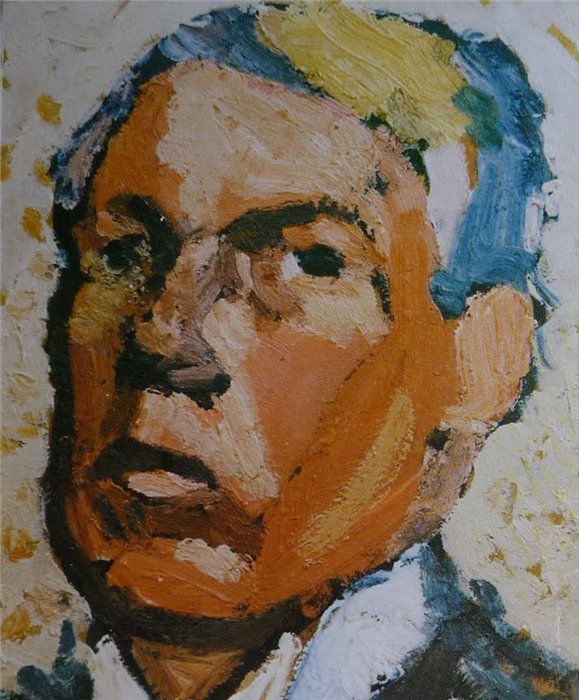

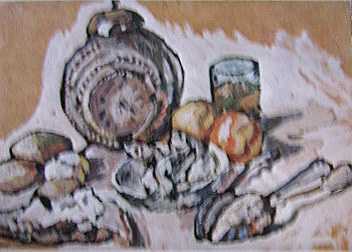

== Appreciation after death ==
During his lifetime, Pettersson did not receive much appreciation for his works. He did not write in formal Swedish but relied heavily on the vocabulary of the local dialect, and publishers had little interest in publishing Joel's texts. Some of Joel's writings appeared in local publications, but most of it remained unpublished.

In 1970, writer and rural dean Valdemar Nyman began editing and publishing Pettersson's writings, starting with Jag har ju sett in 1972, 35 years after Pettersson's death. Nyman also wrote an extensive biography of Pettersson, Pojken och den gråa byn (1977). In recent years Ralf Svenblad has edited and published some of Pettersson's works.

Today, Joel Pettersson is considered to be one of the most important Åland writers.

Pettersson's expressionistic paintings were not appreciated during his life but his genuine painting has later given him the title of Åland's van Gogh.

== Bibliography ==
=== Selected published works ===
==== Edited by Valdemar Nyman ====
- Jag har ju sett (1972)
- Eldtände (1973)
- Frifågel (1974)
- Hallonskogen (1975)

==== Edited by Ralf Svenblad ====
- Pojken som fantasin skenade bort med (1992)
- Knollan. En kosaga (2001)
- Till alla, alla, alla (2002)
- Måndagsmorgon (2004)

=== Publications about Joel Pettersson ===
- Nyman, Valdemar: Pojken och den gråa byn (1977)
