= COVID-19 pandemic in Åland =

Ongoing COVID-19 viral pandemic in the Åland Islands, Finland

COVID-19 pandemic in the Åland Islands
- Disease: COVID-19
- Pathogen: SARS-CoV-2
- Location: Åland (Finland)
- Arrival date: 22 March 2020 (6 years, 4 months, 2 weeks and 3 days)
- Confirmed cases: 5,721
- Deaths: 9
- Test positivity rate: 4.9%

Government website
- https://www.alandstidningen.ax/

The COVID-19 pandemic was confirmed to have reached Åland, an autonomous region of Finland, in March 2020.

== Background ==
On 12 January 2020, the World Health Organization (WHO) confirmed that a novel coronavirus was the cause of a respiratory illness in a cluster of people in Wuhan City, Hubei Province, China, which was reported to the WHO on 31 December 2019.

The case fatality ratio for COVID-19 has been much lower than SARS of 2003, but the transmission has been significantly greater, with a significant total death toll.

== Timeline ==
On 22 March 2020, the first case in the Åland Islands was confirmed.

On 13 April 2020, the Islands reached a total of 10 cases.

== Cases by municipalities ==
Municipality	Cases
Brändö	64
Eckerö	111
Finström	363
Föglö	100
Geta	80
Hammarland	274
Jomala	1,108
Kökar	11
Kumlinge	36
Lemland	478
Lumparland	56
Mariehamn	2,566
Saltvik	266
Sottunga	6
Sund	165
Vårdö	37
Total	5,721
Last update 5 March 2022

== See also ==
- COVID-19 pandemic by country and territory
- COVID-19 pandemic in Europe
