= List of Åland municipalities by population =

This is a list of the municipalities of Åland sorted by population as of 30 September 2012 (30 September 2011):

1. Mariehamn (Maarianhamina) 11,366 (+0,9%)
2. Jomala 4,321 (+2,7%)
3. Finström 2,541 (+0,2%)
4. Lemland 1,879 (+1,5%)
5. Saltvik 1,814 (+0,6%)
6. Hammarland 1,525 (+0,9%)
7. Sund 1,041 (+2,0%)
8. Eckerö 961 (-0,5%)
9. Föglö 575 (-0,2%)
10. Geta 494 (+2,3%)
11. Brändö 482 (-0,6%)
12. Vårdö 442 (-2,9%)
13. Lumparland 396 (-1,0%)
14. Kumlinge 343 (-5,0%)
15. Kökar 244 (-3,6%)
16. Sottunga 102 (-4,7%)
