= Snäckö =

Snäckö is the name of three locations in Finland:

- an island in Kumlinge, Åland
- an island in Nagu, Åboland
- a village in Geta, Åland
