= Åland Highway 4 =

Road in Åland Islands, Finland

Highway 4
- Huvudväg 4 (Swedish); Päätie 4 (Finnish)
- Getavägen

Route information
- Length: 21 km (13 mi)

Major junctions
- From: Finström
- To: Geta

Location
- Country: Finland
- Autonomous region: Åland

Highway system
- Transport in the Åland Islands

Highway 4 (Swedish: Huvudväg 4) is a road in Åland that starts in Godby, the main settlement of Finström, and ends in Geta. The length of the road is 21 kilometers. Unlike other Åland highways, its starting point is not in Mariehamn, nor does it pass through Mariehamn.

The only attraction along the highway is Geta Church.

== Route ==
The road passes through the following localities:

- Finström
- Saltvik
- Geta

== See also ==
- Transport in Åland
- Finnish national road 4

== Source ==
- Grönroos, Matti (2007). "Ahvenanmaan tiet" (in Finnish).
- Isaksson, Krister (August 13, 2018). "Åland – gör det vi inte gör". Bicycling.se (in Swedish).
