= Godby =

- Urban area
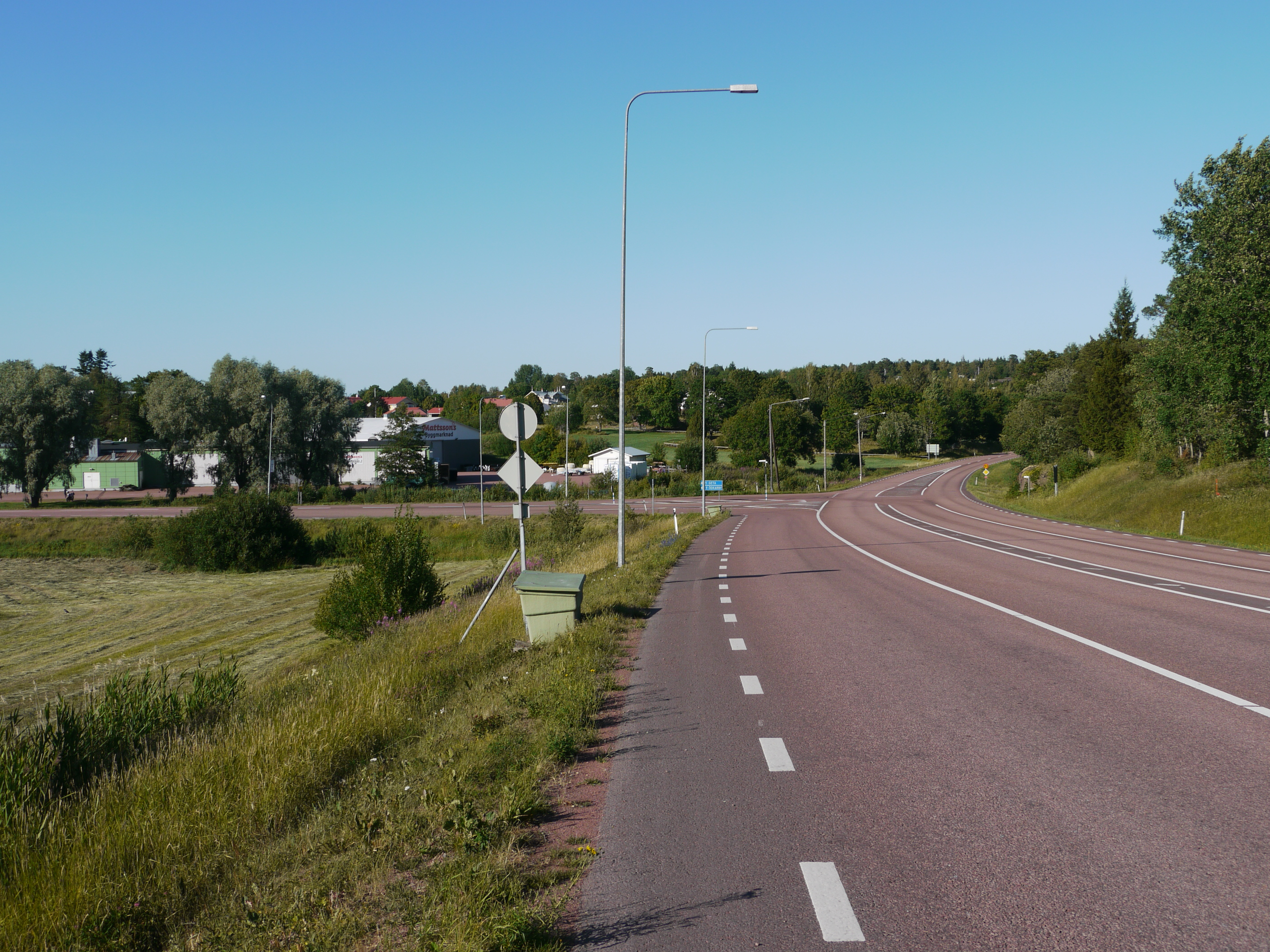
- Highway 2 near Godby

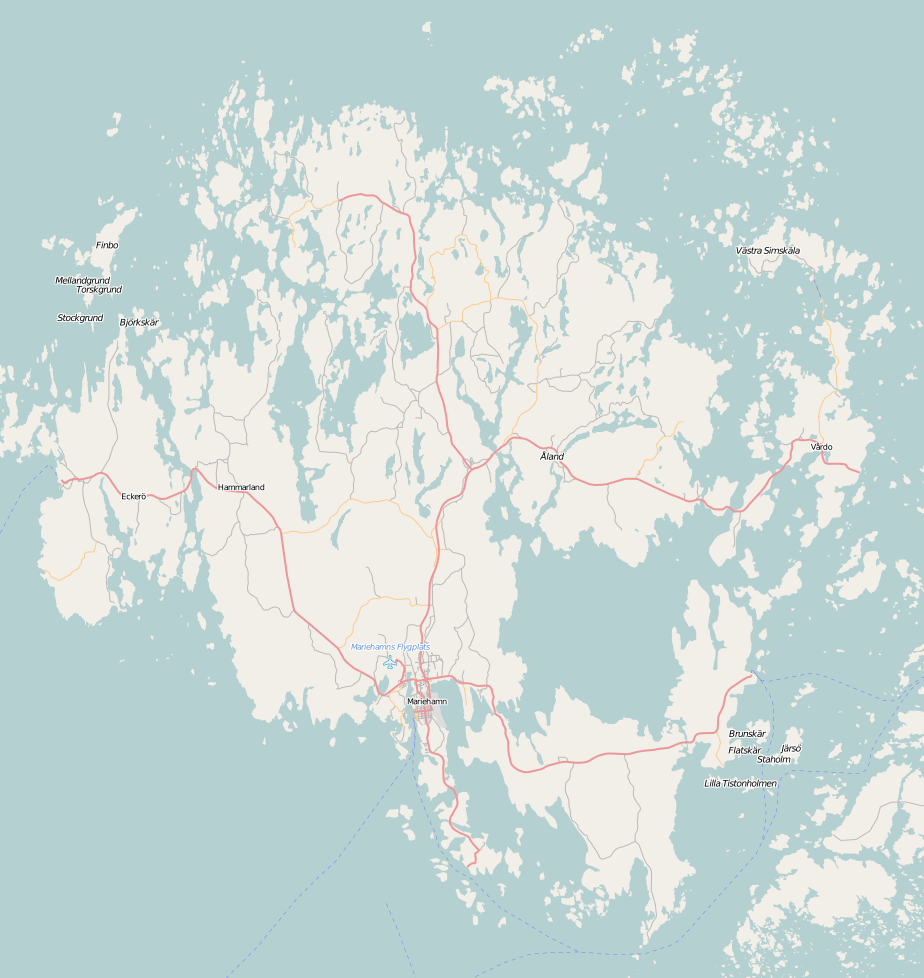
- Location within Åland
- Country: Finland
- Region: Åland
- Municipality: Finström

Area
  - Total: 7.00 km^{2} (2.70 sq mi)

Population (2024)
  - Total: 971
- Postal code: 22410

Godby is a village in Finström, Åland, Finland. Located at the junction of Highway 2 and Highway 4, it lies about 17 km (11 mi) north of Mariehamn. With around 971 residents, it is the second largest urban area in Åland after Mariehamn.

The village offers services such as:

- a pharmacy
- banks
- a post office
- a swimming hall
- a health center
- the upper secondary school Godby högstadieskola

== History ==
During the Finnish Civil War in 1918, the Battle of Godby took place in the village. The events were also linked to the Invasion of Åland during World War I.

== Notable people ==
- Lars Eric Mattsson – guitarist and songwriter
