= Countryside (Åland) =

Subdivision of Finland

Coordinates: 60.2160°N 19.7700°E

Countryside Ålands landsbygd
- Sub-region
- Country: Finland
- Region: Åland

Population (2011)
  - Total: 14,626
- Time zone: UTC+2 (EET)
  - Summer (DST): UTC+3 (EEST)

Countryside is a subdivision of Åland and one of the sub-regions of Finland since 2009.

== Municipalities ==
The municipalities in Countryside are:

Coat of arms	Municipality
Eckerön vaakuna	Eckerö (municipality)
Finströmin vaakuna	Finström (municipality)
Getan vaakuna	Geta (municipality)
Hammarlandin vaakuna	Hammarland (municipality)
Jomalan vaakuna	Jomala (municipality)
Lemlandin vaakuna	Lemland (municipality)
Lumparlandin vaakuna	Lumparland (municipality)
Saltvikin vaakuna	Saltvik (municipality)
Sundin vaakuna	Sund (municipality)
