= Håkan Skogsjö =

Swedish-Ålandic journalist, author and genealogist (born 1958)

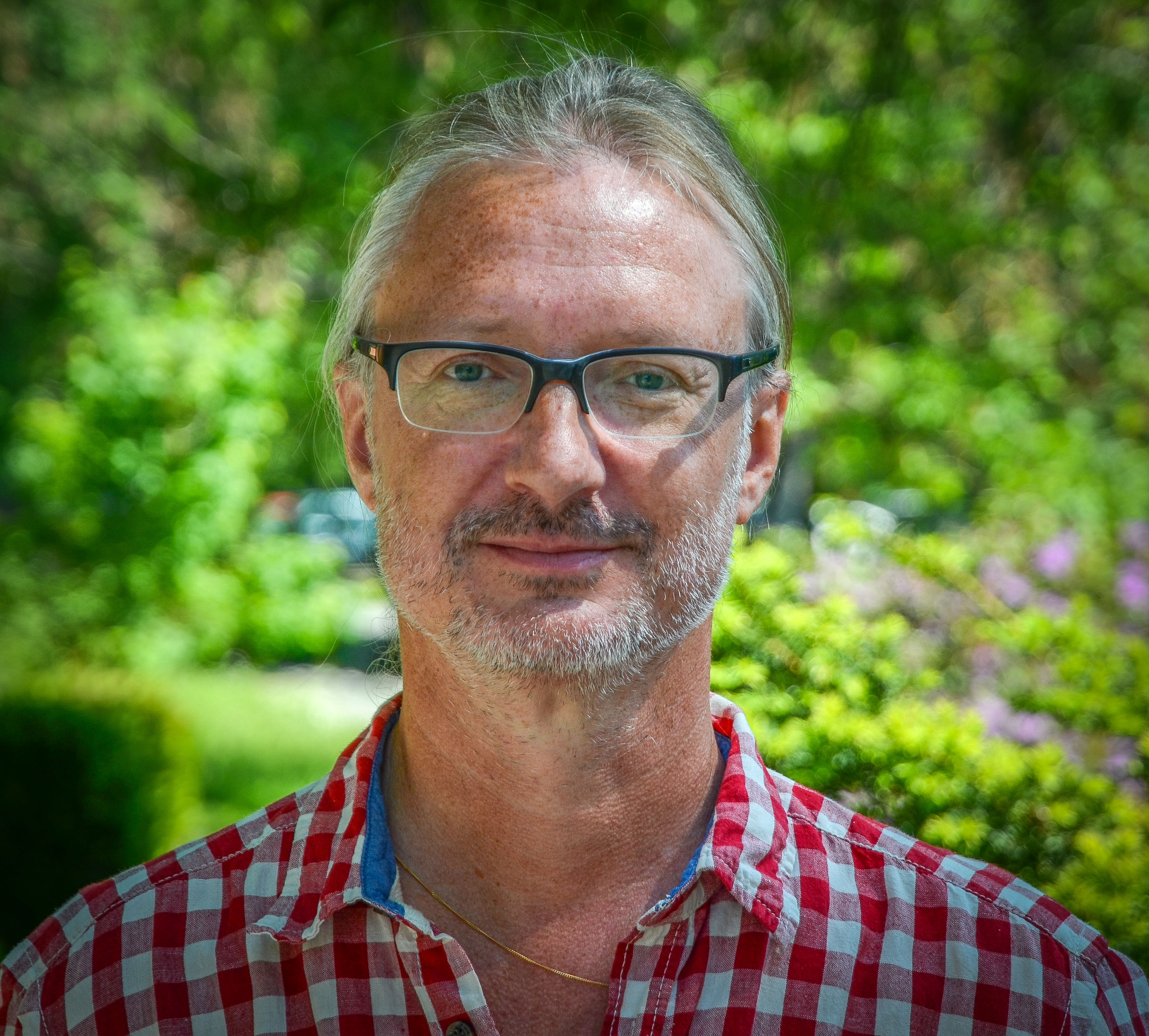
- Skogsjö in 2013
- Born: 11 November 1958 (age 67); Mölndal, Sweden
- Occupations: Journalist, author, genealogist and book publisher
- Known for: His writings
- Notable work: Ålands släktregister; Nättidningen Rötter ("Swedish Roots"); Explore Your Swedish Heritage
- Website: www.bokhandeln.ax

Lars Håkan Skogsjö (born 11 November 1958, in Mölndal, Sweden) is a Swedish-Ålandic journalist and author and a veteran in the Swedish genealogy movement. He lives since 1989 permanently in Mariehamn, Åland, an autonomous region of Finland.

== Education and career ==
=== Education ===
Skogsjö studied Nordic languages at the University of Gothenburg, Sweden, 1983–1984, and attended the School of Journalism in Gothenburg 1985–1987.

=== Career as journalist and book publisher ===
- Journalist at Radio Åland (1986–1989)
- Journalist at the Nya Åland newspaper (1989–1994).
- Vice president of the Ålands journalister trade union (in the early 1990s)
- Freelance journalist and author focusing on historical topics (since 1994).
- Board member of Nya Ålands tidningsaktiebolag (from 2002 up to around 2017)
- Graphic designer and book publisher with his own publishing house (SkogsjöMedia) (since 1994)
- Board member of the Swedish company Arkiv Digital (since 2013).

== Engagement in the Swedish genealogy movement ==
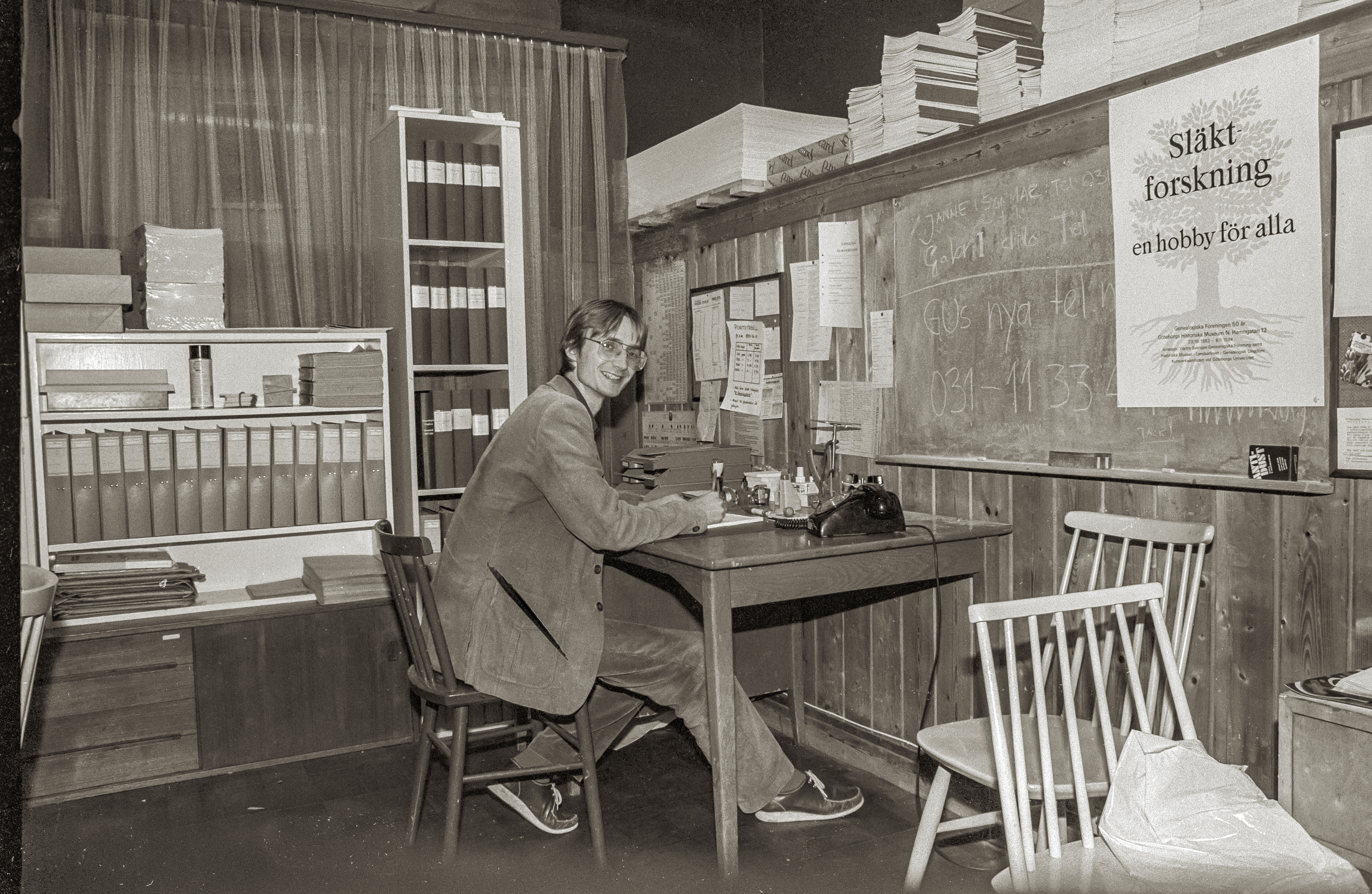
Håkan Skogsjö in the office of Genealogisk Ungdom at Tellgrensgatan 2, Gothenburg, on 8 September 1983. Unknown photographer.

Håkan Skogsjö began his genealogical research at the age of twelve or thirteen. He was one of the initiators of Genealogisk ungdom ("Genealogical Youth"), a genealogy association founded on 5 February 1977, in his home. Initially, it served as a regional association for younger genealogists in Western Sweden. However, the association soon expanded into a nationwide organization for all age groups. Its ambition was to publish various publications to support genealogists, among them Genealogisk Ungdoms Tidskrift ("Genealogical Youth’s Magazine"), which released its first issue in 1977 with Skogsjö as editor. In 1982, the name of the magazine was changed to Släkthistoriskt Forum.

Skogsjö was a driving force behind the formation of the Federation of Swedish Genealogical Societies ("Sveriges Släktforskarförbund") in 1986. He served on both the preparatory interim board and the first Federation board, holding the position of its vice-chairman from 1986 to 1988. Släkthistoriskt Forum then became the Federation's magazine, and Skogsjö continued as editor until 1991.

In the 1980s, he and genealogist Bo Lindwall from Södertälje conducted groundbreaking research on Swedish Traveller families, many of them of Roma origin. Their collection of materials on Travellers is housed in the Swedish National Archives in Gothenburg.

As a private initiative, Skogsjö launched a genealogy website in May 1996, which was taken over by the Federation in September of the same year and became the online newspaper Nättidningen Rötter (now "Rötter"; its English name is "Swedish Roots"), the world's first daily newspaper for genealogists. He served as its editor from its inception until May 2004. He initiated the now gigantic genealogical discussion forum Anbytarforum (literally, "Forum for the Exchange of Ancestors"), which was launched on 13 December 1998. He also created the image database Porträttfynd ("Old Portraits Database"), where scanned cartes de visite and cabinet cards from the 19th and early 20th centuries can be uploaded, commented on, and thus preserved for posterity. As of December 2024, this database contained over 270,000 photos.

Skogsjö served as the editor of the Federation's annual book, Släktforskarnas årsbok, from 1995 to 2013. He was also one of the developers of the Swedish genealogy software "Holger".

== Writings ==
=== On Swedish genealogy and local history ===
Håkan Skogsjö has written a large number of articles and books on genealogy and local history. The Swedish library catalog LIBRIS lists (as of 23 February 2025) 144 published works by him, with the article Biskop Rhyzelius’ släktanteckningar ("Bishop Rhyzelius’ Genealogical Notes") in Släkt och Hävd 1979 being the oldest. Most of his articles are not included in LIBRIS, though. Among his earlier works are a transcription of the 1535 tax registers for the entire province of Ångermanland (1979) and his "parish genealogy" covering all families resident in Edsele parish in Ångermanland during the period 1694–1808 (1987).

Skogsjö has also published several articles on the methodology of source-critical genealogical research. His handbook Släktforskning på riktigt, was published in 2019, with a second, expanded edition in 2021, and a third, further expanded edition, in 2024. An English version, Explore Your Swedish Heritage, was printed in 2020 and again in 2023; see below. Professor Michael Lundholm, editor of Svensk Genealogisk Tidskrift ("Swedish Genealogy Magazine"), gave in 2022 the following assessment of the Swedish version: “In my opinion, the handbook is the best introductory guide to genealogy written so far.”

=== On the history and the families of Åland ===
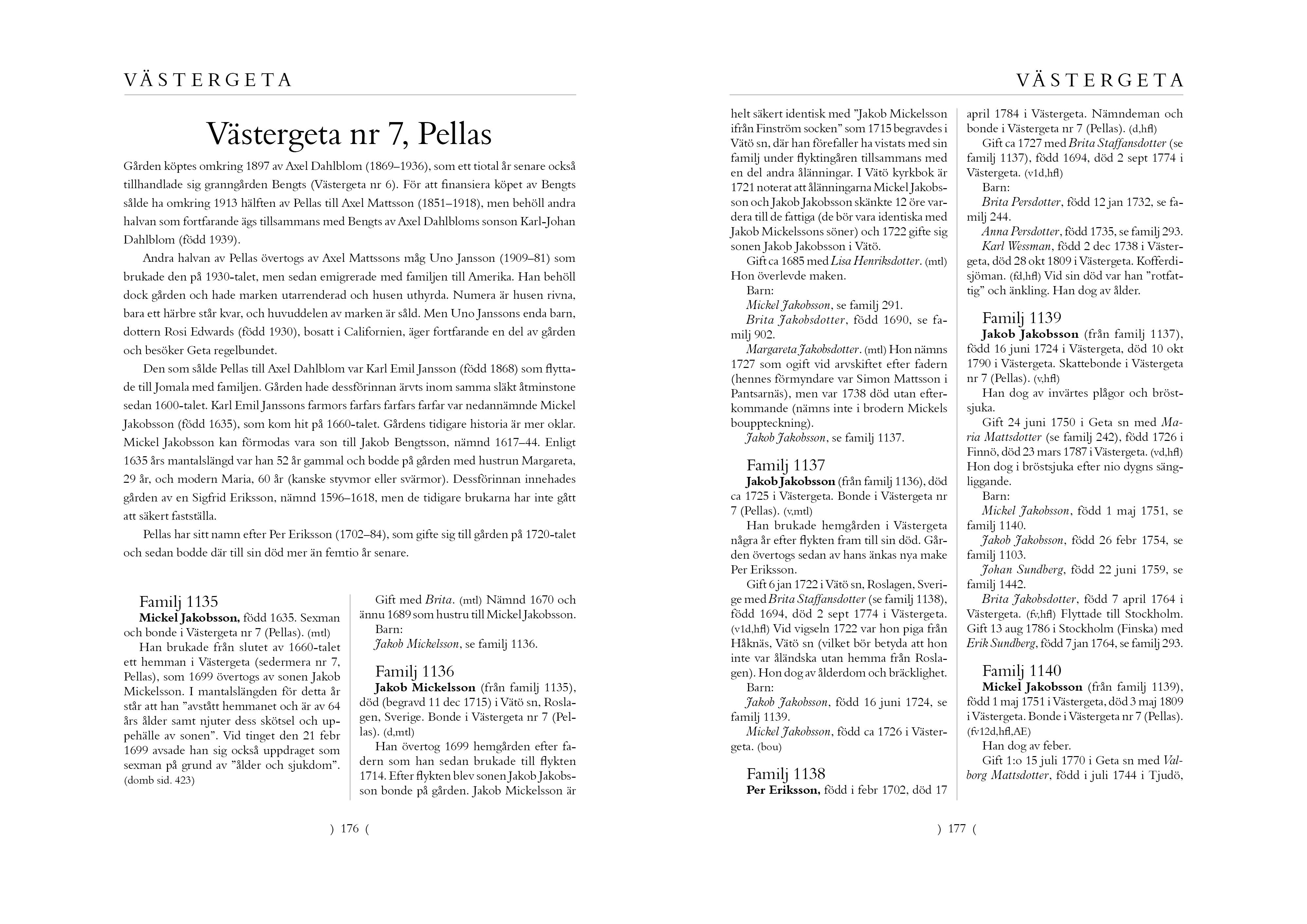
A spread from Håkan Skogsjö's Familjer och gårdar i Geta, vol. 2 (pages 176–177) (2011), a part of his book series Ålands släktregister ("The Family Histories of Åland"). This spread summarizes the history of the farmstead Västergeta no. 7 in the Geta parish and presents the first families living there.

Skogsjö has authored and published several works focusing on Åland and its history, both on his own and in collaboration with others. Notable among these are Skotten i tornvillan (1997), a history of the first 75 years of Åland's self-government; the guide book Sevärt på Åland: den nödvändiga guiden för dig som vill veta lite mer (1998 and 1999); Bomarsund: det ryska imperiets utpost i väster (2004), and Ett svunnet Åland (2010), forty-two depictions of Åland’s history based on extensive archival material of various kinds.

But most of all, he has made a name for himself in Finland and on Åland through his nine extensive parish genealogies (five of which are double volumes), published under the name Ålands släktregister (“The Family Histories of Åland”). In these, he has documented the permanently residing population of most Åland municipalities – corresponding to parishes in Sweden and Finland – from the 17th century to the present. Each volume contains a history of the municipality as a whole, as well as histories for each hamlet, down to each original homestead and the families who lived there. "Down to the finest genealogical detail, life in the countryside over hundreds of years is described." (Uppslagsverket Finland) As of 2025, the total page count of the series amounts to 10,084. The volumes thus constitute the largest genealogical work ever published by an individual in Sweden and Finland. The following Åland municipalities are covered: Lumparland, Kumlinge, Brändö, Vårdö, Sund (two volumes), Lemland (two volumes), Saltvik (two volumes), Föglö (two volumes), and Geta (two volumes). These parish genealogies are based on a wide selection of sources, from church records and court books to newspaper clippings, maps, and older photographs; for more recent conditions, Skogsjö has also used oral traditions.

=== Books translated into English ===
Four of his books are available in English:

- The book of the Pommern (2002), written together with J. Örjans
- Bomarsund: The Russian empire’s outpost in the West (2006), written together with Gr. Robins and J. Örjans
- Åland: a Baltic archipelago (2007, reprinted in 2017), written together with Kj. Ekström
- Explore your Swedish heritage (2020, with an expanded edition in 2023).

== Awards ==
- In 2000, appointed research member of the Genealogical Society of Finland.
- In 2003, received the Julius Sundblom Memorial Foundation Diploma.
- In 2004, received a research grant from the Federation of Swedish Genealogical Societies
- In 2012, awarded Åland’s Self-Government Jubilee Medal from 1997 (“Ålands självstyrelses jubileumsmedalj från 1997”)
- In 2014, received the Åland Regional Cultural Award (“Ålands kulturpris”) for his publications focused on local history.
- In 2015, received the Victor Örnbergs Honorary Award from the Federation of Swedish Genealogical Societies.
