= Finström =

- Municipality
- Finströms kommun
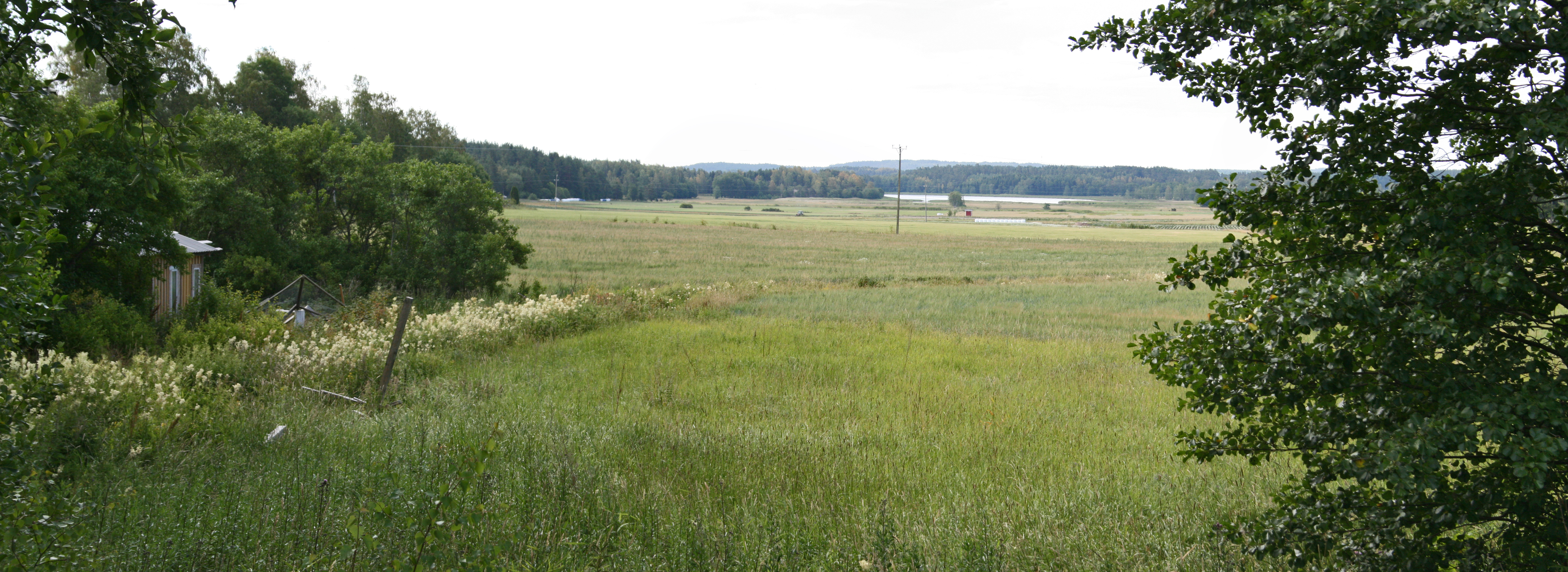
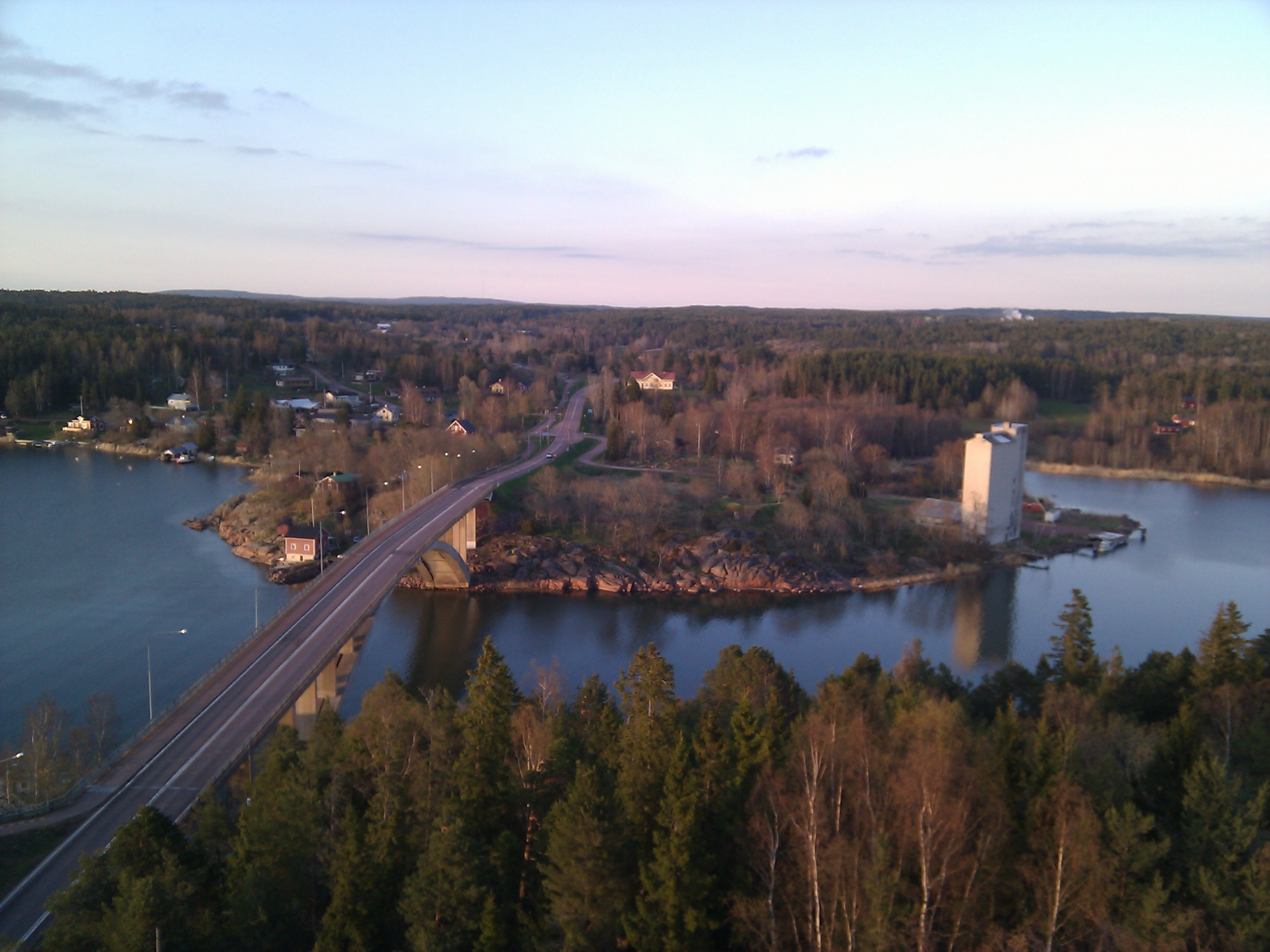
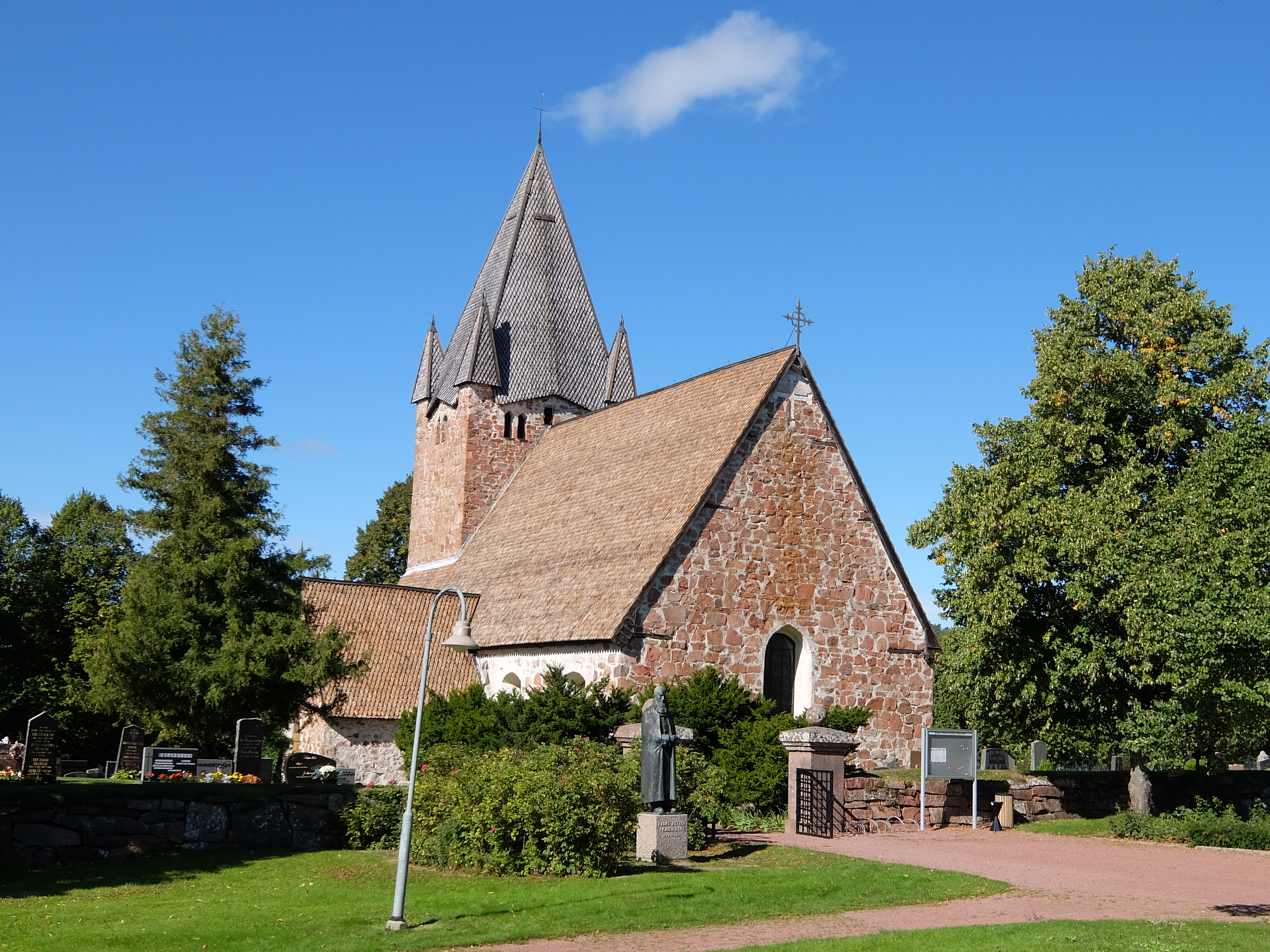
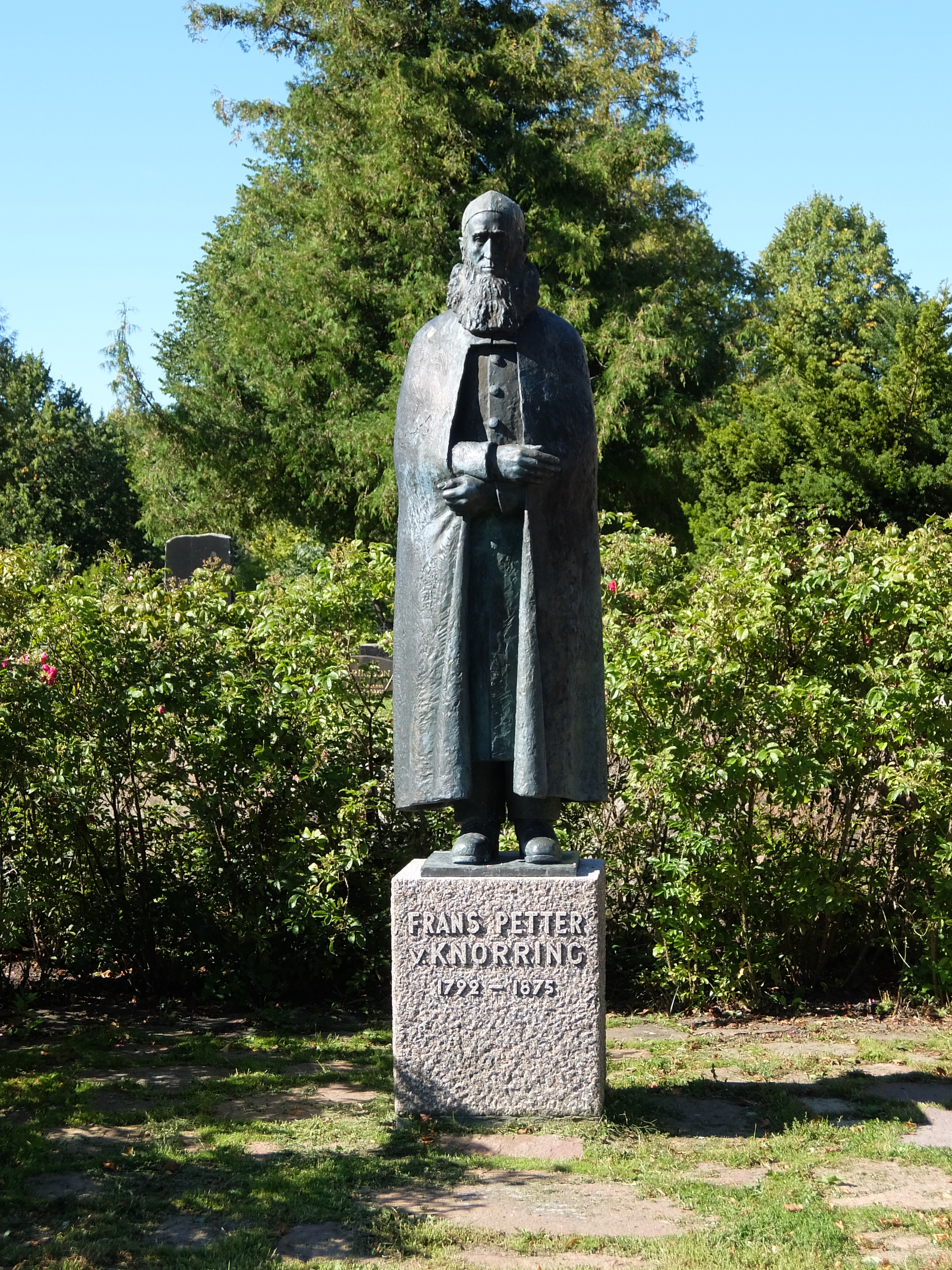
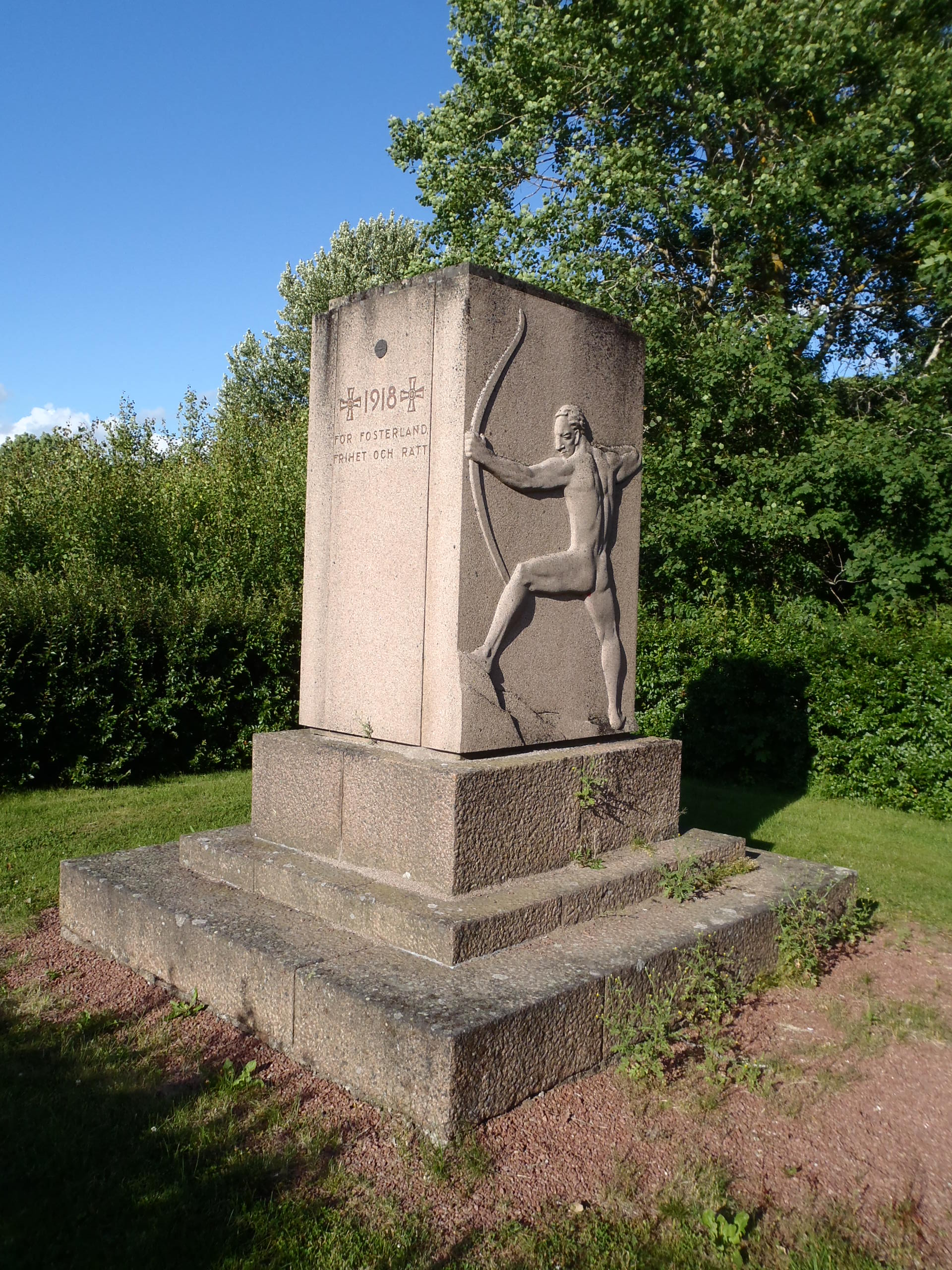
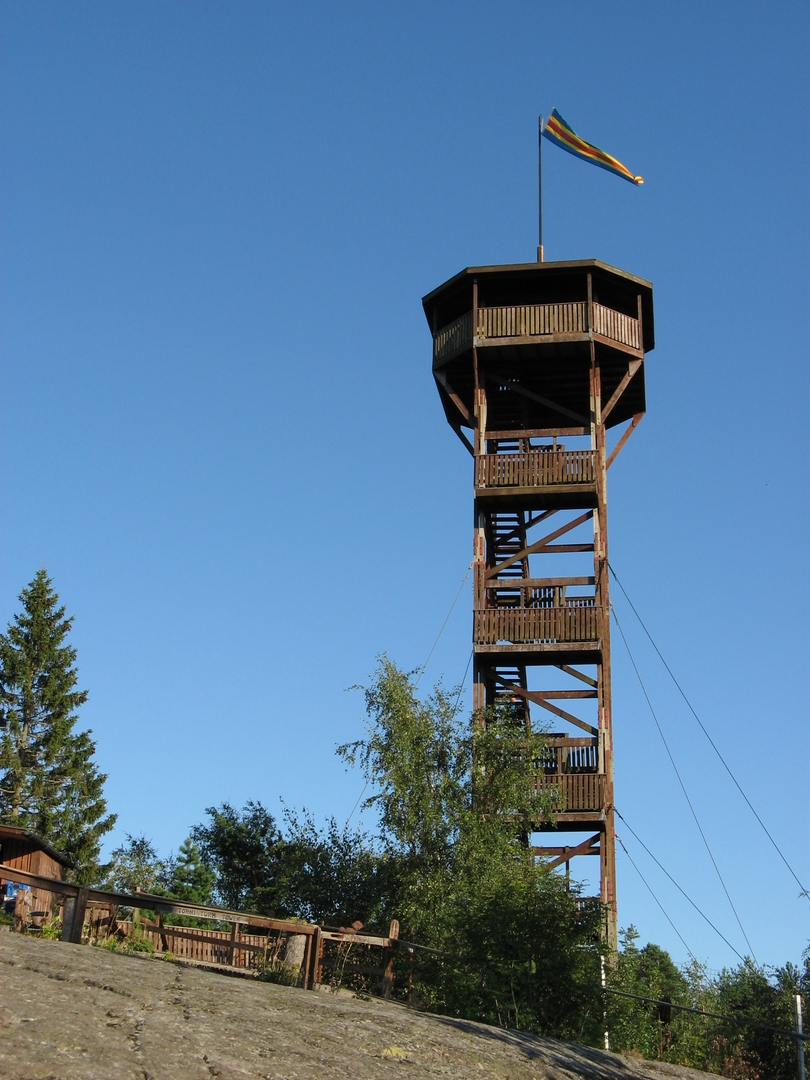
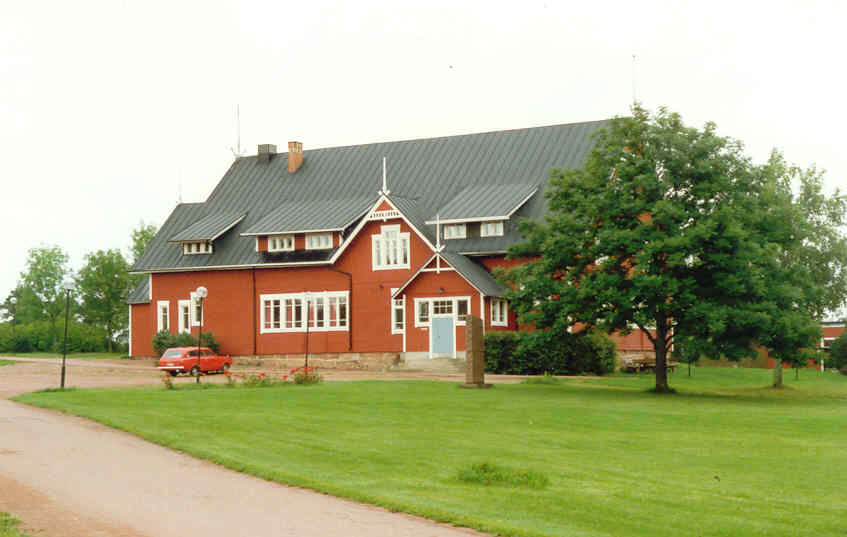
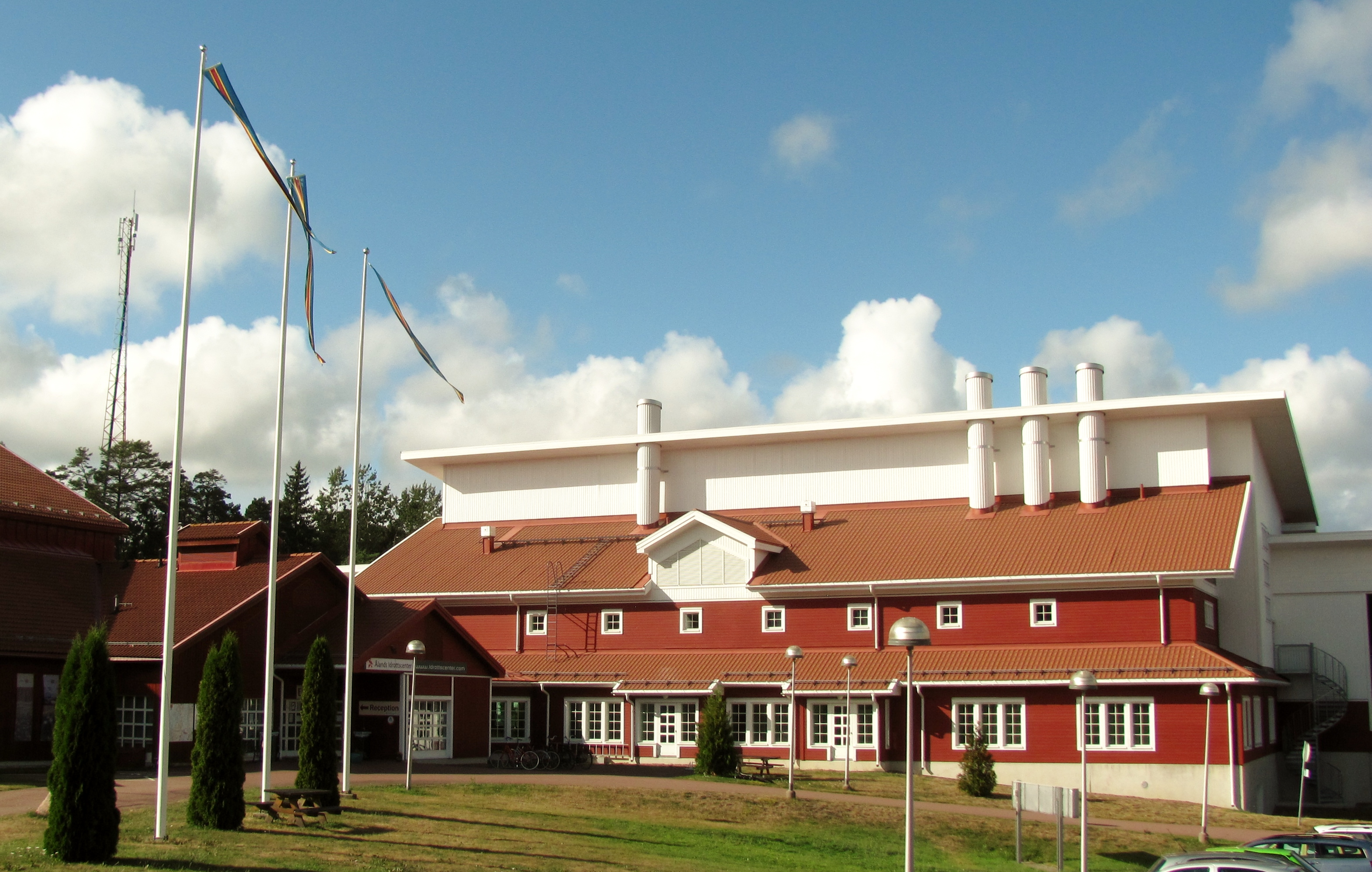
- Finström

- Coat of arms

- Location of Finström in Finland

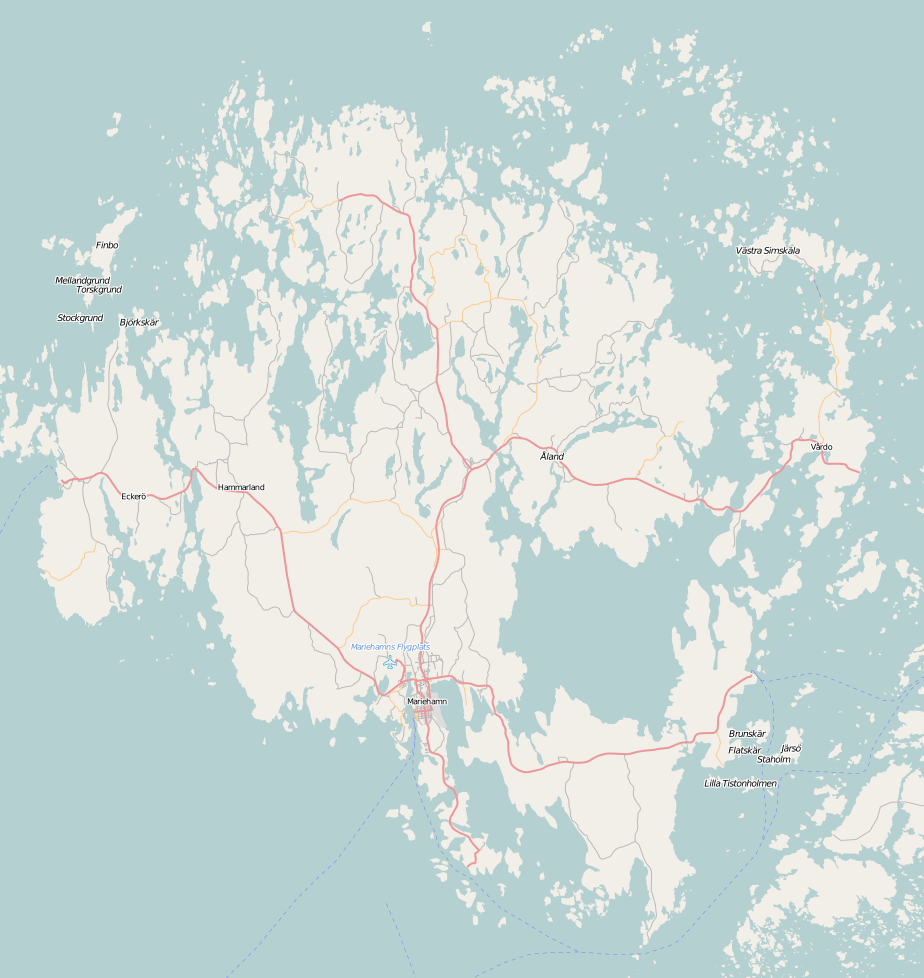
- Location in Åland
- Coordinates: 60°14′N 019°59.5′E
- Country: Finland
- Region: Åland
- Sub-region: Countryside
- Seat: Godby

Government
  - Municipal manager: Magnus Sandberg

Area (2018-01-01)
  - Total: 172.50 km^{2} (66.60 sq mi)
  - Land: 123.43 km^{2} (47.66 sq mi)
  - Water: 49.23 km^{2} (19.01 sq mi)
  - Rank: 289th largest in Finland

Population (2025-12-31)
  - Total: 2,625
  - Rank: 227th largest in Finland
  - Density: 21.27/km^{2} (55.1/sq mi)

Population by native language
  - Swedish: 88.7% (official)
  - Finnish: 2.5%
  - Others: 8.8%

Population by age
  - 0 to 14: 17.9%
  - 15 to 64: 59.9%
  - 65 or older: 22.2%
- Time zone: UTC+02:00 (EET)
  - Summer (DST): UTC+03:00 (EEST)
- Website: www.finstrom.ax

Finström is a municipality of Åland, an autonomous territory of Finland. The municipality has a population of 2,625 (31 December 2025) of which 88.7% speak Swedish and 2.5% Finnish as their first language. The municipality covers an area of 172.50 square kilometres (66.60 sq mi) of which 49.23 km^{2} (19.01 sq mi) is water. The population density is 21.27 inhabitants per square kilometre (55.1/sq mi). The municipality is unilingually Swedish.

Godby, the largest village and administrative centre of Finström, is the second biggest built-up area in Åland after Mariehamn, inhabited by around 1,300 people, or one-thirds of the municipality's population. A pharmacy, banks, a post office, a swimming hall and a health center are among the amenities that can be found in Godby.

== History ==
Finström was widely inhabited in the Viking Age. The church of St. Michael is one of the oldest in Åland with the oldest parts dating from the 12th century. Grelsby kungsgård was the place where king Gustavus Vasa stayed with his entourage of 312 people for a few days in the spring of 1556. Swedish king Gustaf IV Adolf also stayed there for six weeks in the summer of 1808 prior to the 1809 loss of Finland to Russia. During the Finnish Civil War several communists were executed outside Godby, on the ice of Färjsundet.

== Geography ==
Finström is right in the middle of mainland Åland and is bordered by a total of five municipalities: Sund to the east, Saltvik to the northeast, Geta to the north, Hammarland to the west and Jomala to the south. The most significant main roads of Finström are Highway 2 between Mariehamn and Sund, and Highway 4 to Geta.

Långsjön, the largest lake in Åland, is located in the municipality, as is the Almskogen nature reserve. Notable bays include Kasviken and Ödkarbyviken.

== Economy ==
Godby is by far the center of Finström's economy. The biggest employer in the municipality is Optinova, a plastic factory with 130 employees. Tourism is also an important line of business.

Agricultural products grown especially in the northern parts of Finström include apples and various vegetables, and fishing is also a source of income for some.

== Notable people ==
- Kaj Himberg (1844–1927), polymath
- Karl Emanuel Jansson (1846–1874), painter
- Daniel Sjölund (born 1983), footballer (380 club and 37 national appearances)
- Annica Sjölund (born 1985), footballer (67 national appearances)

== Images ==
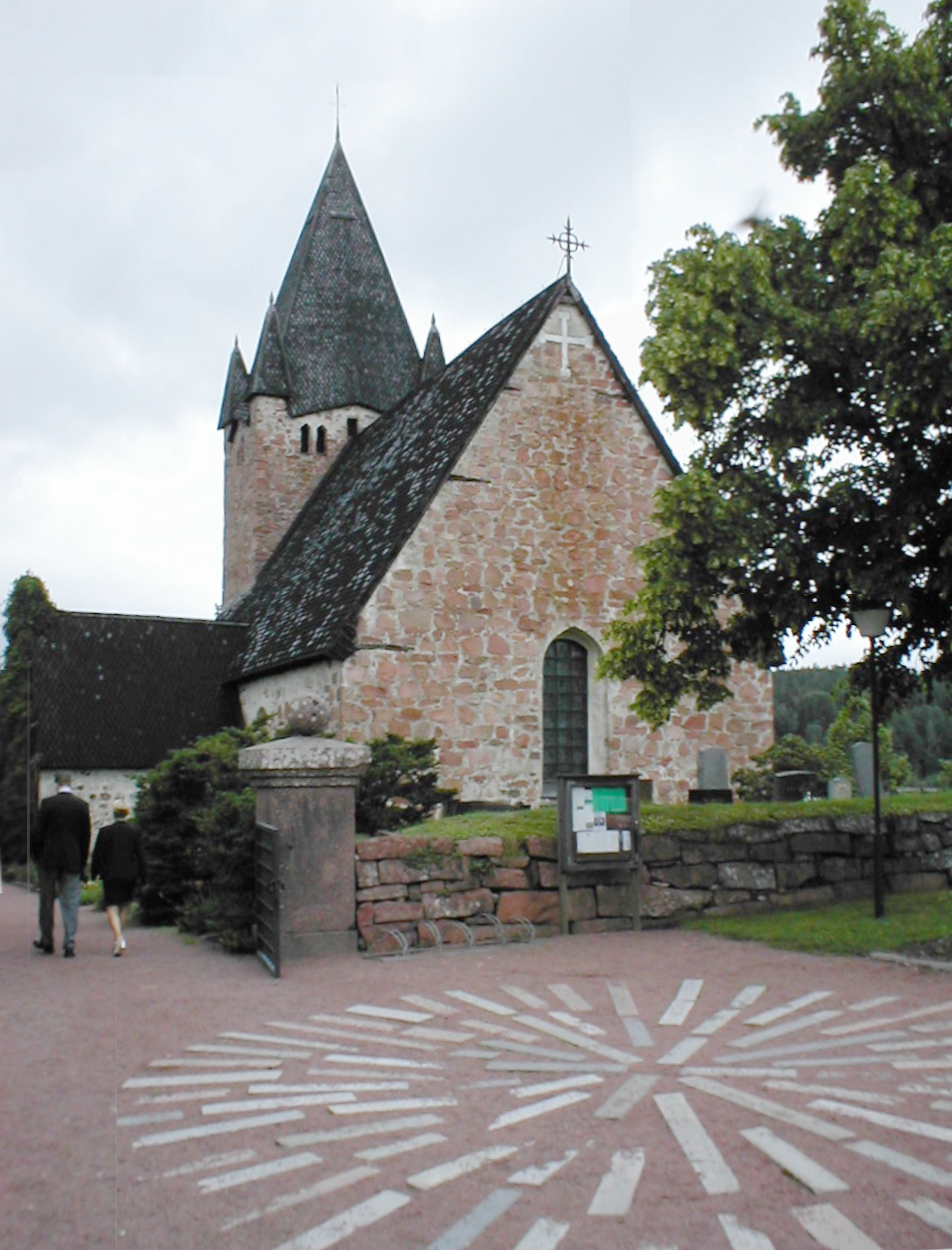
St. Michael's Church

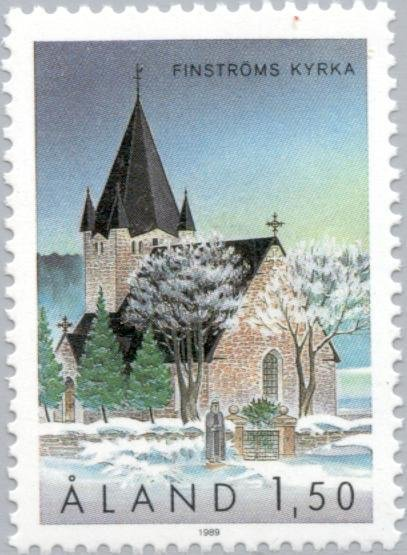
Postage stamp, Finland, 1989
