= Lumparland =

- Municipality
- Lumparlands kommun
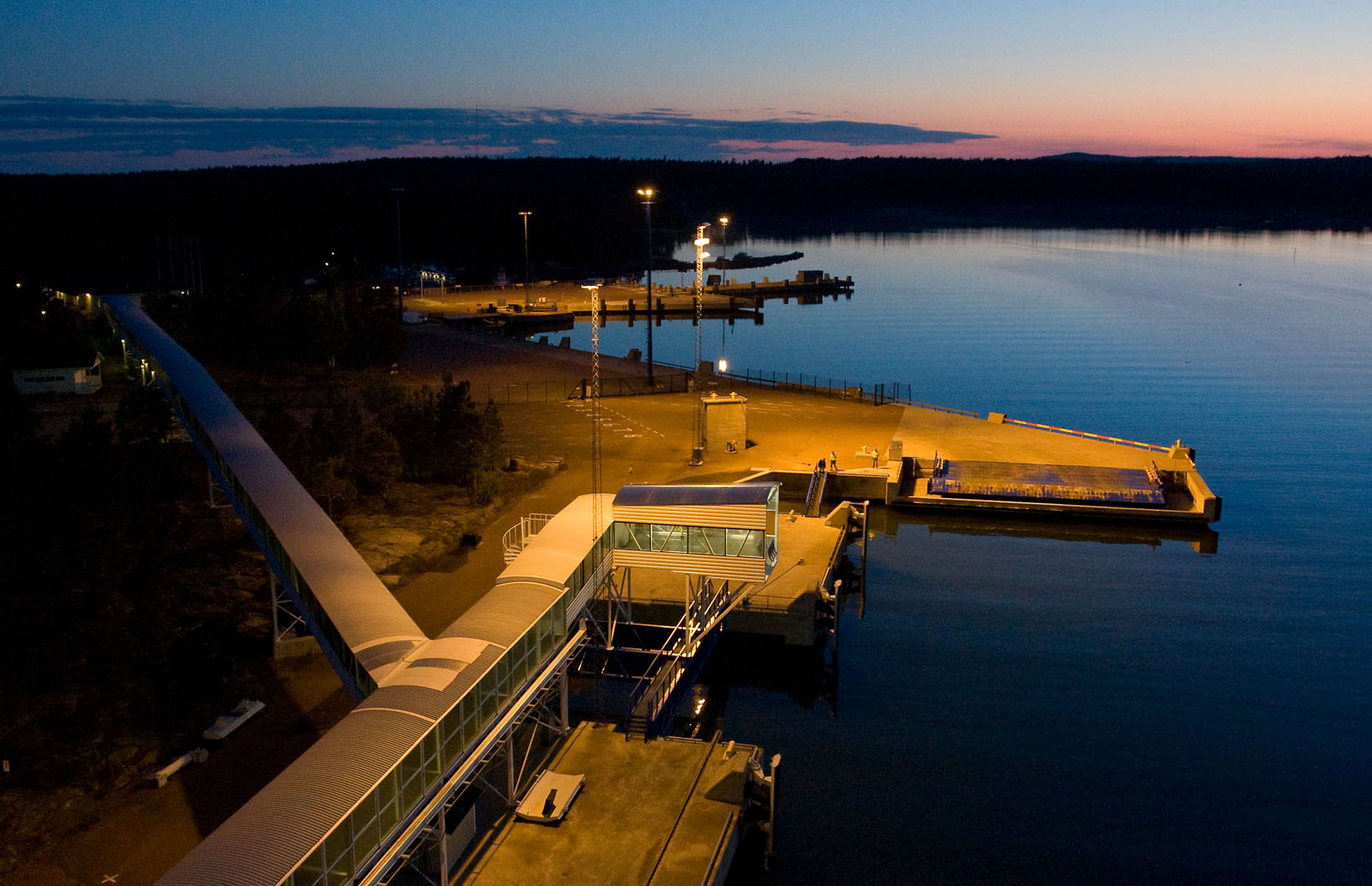

- Coat of arms

- Location of Lumparland in Finland

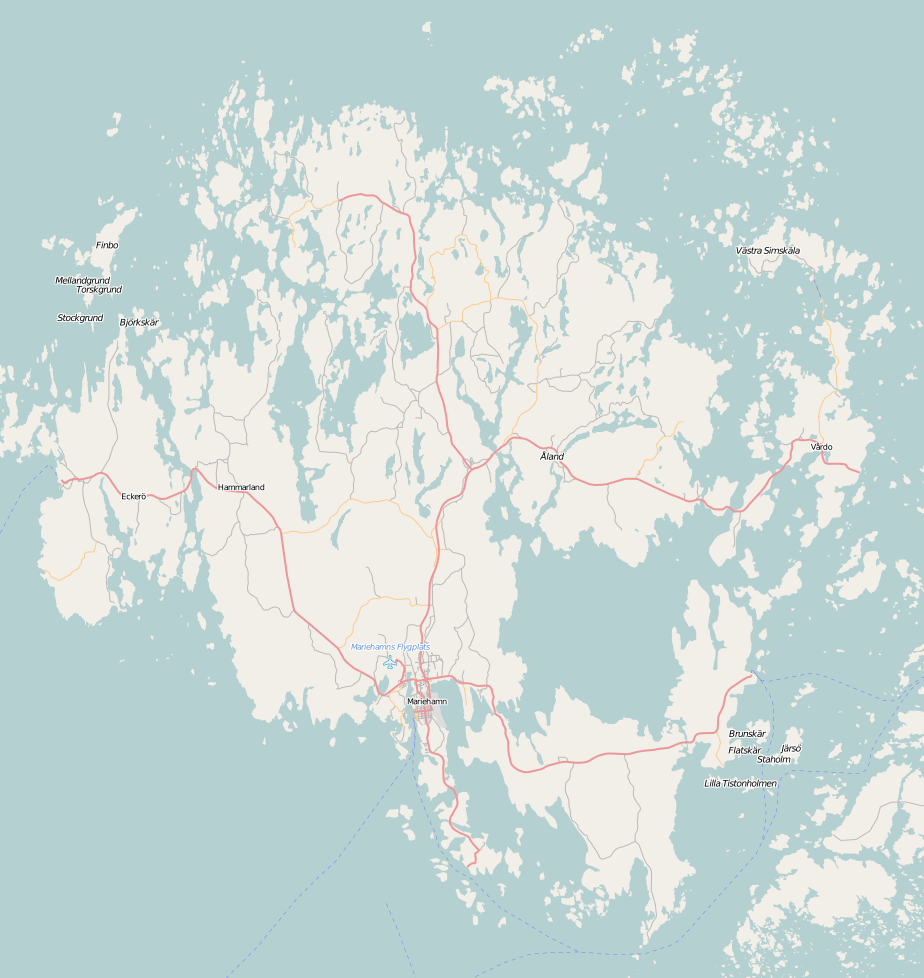
- Location in Åland
- Coordinates: 60°07′N 020°15.5′E
- Country: Finland
- Region: Åland
- Sub-region: Countryside

Government
  - Municipal manager: Mattias Jansryd

Area (2018-01-01)
  - Total: 87.04 km^{2} (33.61 sq mi)
  - Land: 36.35 km^{2} (14.03 sq mi)
  - Water: 50.8 km^{2} (19.6 sq mi)
  - Rank: 308th largest in Finland

Population (2025-12-31)
  - Total: 371
  - Rank: 305th largest in Finland
  - Density: 10.21/km^{2} (26.4/sq mi)

Population by native language
  - Swedish: 85.2% (official)
  - Finnish: 6.2%
  - Others: 8.6%

Population by age
  - 0 to 14: 14.8%
  - 15 to 64: 57.8%
  - 65 or older: 27.4%
- Time zone: UTC+02:00 (EET)
  - Summer (DST): UTC+03:00 (EEST)
- Website: www.lumparland.ax

Lumparland is a municipality of Åland, an autonomous territory of Finland. It is the smallest municipality on mainland Åland. The municipality has a population of 371 (31 December 2025) and covers an area of 87.04 square kilometres (33.61 sq mi) of which 50.8 km^{2} (19.6 sq mi) is water. The population density is 10.21 inhabitants per square kilometre (26.4/sq mi). The municipality is unilingually Swedish.

The main village is Klemetsby, where there is a bank, a church, a post office and a school. Klemetsby is 25 kilometres (16 mi) away from Mariehamn along the Highway 3. The ferry port of Långnäs is situated in the eastern part of Lumparland.

Lumparland was the last municipality in Finland to establish its own website which happened in 2004. The municipality has previously also been known as "'Lumparlanti" in some Finnish documents, but is today referred to as "Lumparland" also in Finnish.

According to a 2026 study by Iltalehti, the highest number of crimes against life and health of all Finnish municipalities (excluding cities) occurs in Lumparland; the ratio was 2.70 compared to the municipality's nearly 400 inhabitants. The Åland Police Department explained the statistical result by the Långnäs harbour used by cruise ships, and any crime committed on board is registered in the Lumparland municipality when, for example, the person who committed the crime is removed from the ship in Lumparland, where the police arrest person.

== Geography ==
Lumparland borders the eastern edge of a billion-year-old nine-kilometer wide water filled impact crater, Lumparn, which is devoid of islands.

Lumpokasen (60.7 m or 199 ft) is the highest point in the municipality.

== Historic population ==
Håkan Skogsjö has documented the permanently residing population of Lumparland from the 17th century to the present, covering the history of the municipality as a whole, its individual hamlets, down to each original farmstead and the families who lived there.

== Economy ==
Agriculture and tourism are the most important lines of business in Lumparland.

== Sights ==
The Church of Lumparland, dedicated to St. Andrew, is the oldest surviving wooden church in Åland, dating back to the 1720s. Inside the church, the altar painting is the work of Victor Westerholm. There is also a miniature ship from 1836 inside the church.

== Notable people ==
- Robert Helenius (born 1984), a professional boxer
