= Lemland =

- Municipality
- Lemlands kommun
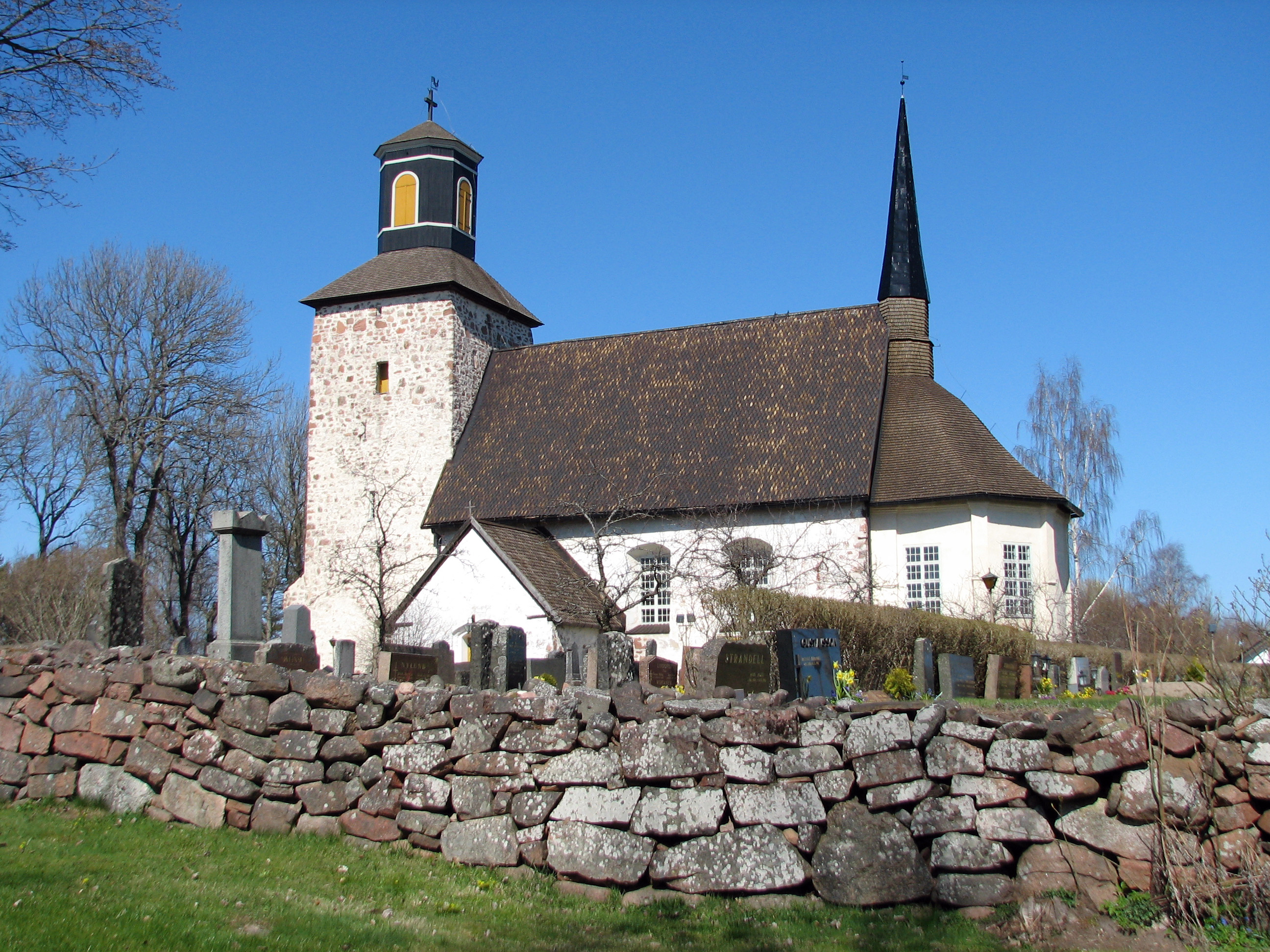
- The medieval parish church in Lemland.

- Coat of arms

- Location of Lemland in Finland

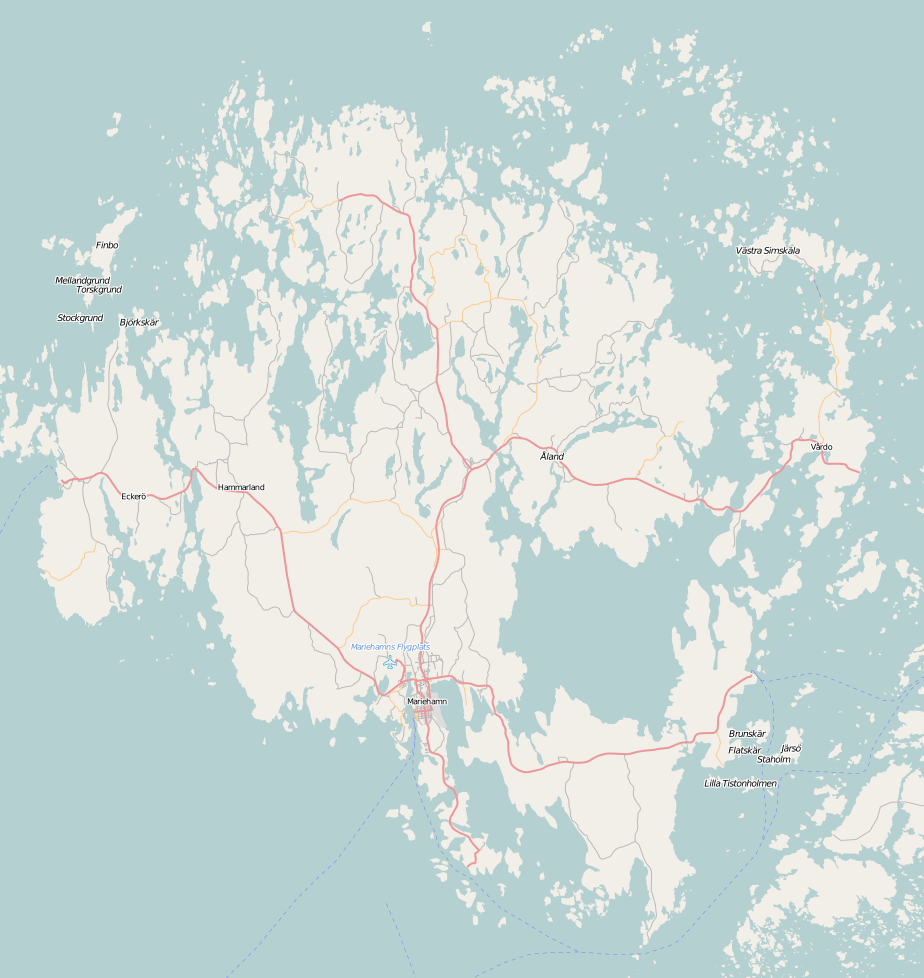
- Location in Åland
- Coordinates: 60°04.2′N 020°05.2′E
- Country: Finland
- Region: Åland
- Sub-region: Countryside

Government
  - Municipal manager: Mikael Smeds

Area (2018-01-01)
  - Total: 965.30 km^{2} (372.70 sq mi)
  - Land: 113.21 km^{2} (43.71 sq mi)
  - Water: 852.23 km^{2} (329.05 sq mi)
  - Rank: 293rd largest in Finland

Population (2025-12-31)
  - Total: 2,139
  - Rank: 250th largest in Finland
  - Density: 18.89/km^{2} (48.9/sq mi)

Population by native language
  - Swedish: 90.6% (official)
  - Finnish: 3.4%
  - Others: 6%

Population by age
  - 0 to 14: 20.6%
  - 15 to 64: 61.2%
  - 65 or older: 18.2%
- Time zone: UTC+02:00 (EET)
  - Summer (DST): UTC+03:00 (EEST)
- Website: www.lemland.ax

Lemland is a municipality of Åland, an autonomous territory of Finland. Covering a land area of 113.21 km^{2} (43.71 sq mi), it had a population of 2,133 in 2025. The majority of Lemland's population speaks Swedish. The Lemström Canal, carved in 1882, separates Åland’s main island from the Lemland peninsula. Historically, the municipality has been an important maritime hub, given its strategic location in the Baltic Sea.

== History ==
Evidence of early human activity in Åland dates back to around 5000 BC, with the early seasonal settlement developing into a permanent settlement later. During the Viking era (8th to 11th century CE), the islands assumed strategic importance. Aland came under the Swedish influence in the 13th century. The Lemland Church, a significant historical landmark, was built in stages, with its oldest parts dating prior to 15th century. Though the current structure is dated to 15th century, the original structure built in the 13th century had paintings in the ceilings and wooden sculptures dated added in the 14th century. It is dedicated to Bridget of Sweden. During the Finnish War in 1808, the Swedish king Gustav IV Adolf had his headquarters in the Lemland parsonage. As per Håkan Skogsjö, the ancestry of the permanently residing population of Lemland and owners of farmsteads could be traced back to the 18th century.

== Geography ==
Lemland is a municipality located in the autonomous region of Åland. The municipality spans an area of approximately 965.3 km^{2} (372.7 sq mi) of which 852.23 km^{2} (329.05 sq mi) is covered by water. The Lemström Canal, carved in 1882, connects the sea inlet east of Mariehamn, the capital of Åland and Lumparn. There is a bridge over the canal.

=== Climate ===
Climate data for Lemland Nyhamn (1991–2020 normals, extremes 1959–present)
Month	Jan	Feb	Mar	Apr	May	Jun	Jul	Aug	Sep	Oct	Nov	Dec	Year
Record high °C (°F)	8.5 (47.3)	7.8 (46.0)	11.1 (52.0)	16.4 (61.5)	23.5 (74.3)	26.5 (79.7)	28.7 (83.7)	26.9 (80.4)	21.4 (70.5)	16.4 (61.5)	12.7 (54.9)	9.3 (48.7)	28.7 (83.7)
Daily mean °C (°F)	0.2 (32.4)	−1.1 (30.0)	0.4 (32.7)	3.2 (37.8)	7.7 (45.9)	12.4 (54.3)	16.7 (62.1)	16.9 (62.4)	13.1 (55.6)	8.3 (46.9)	4.6 (40.3)	2.1 (35.8)	7.0 (44.6)
Record low °C (°F)	−29.2 (−20.6)	−24.9 (−12.8)	−17.3 (0.9)	−12.8 (9.0)	−1.2 (29.8)	2.2 (36.0)	6.4 (43.5)	4.0 (39.2)	2.0 (35.6)	−3.0 (26.6)	−8.5 (16.7)	−23.0 (−9.4)	−29.2 (−20.6)
Source 1: FMI climatological normals for Finland 1991–2020
Source 2: Record highs and lows 1959–present

== Demographics ==
The municipality has a population of 2,139 (31 December 2025) Males and females constituted almost equal proportion of the population, with 526 individuals under the age of 17 years. Almost the entire population is classified as rural. Swedish language is spoken by majority (90.6%) of the population. About 81.9% of the population identified as Finnish citizens.

== Gallery ==
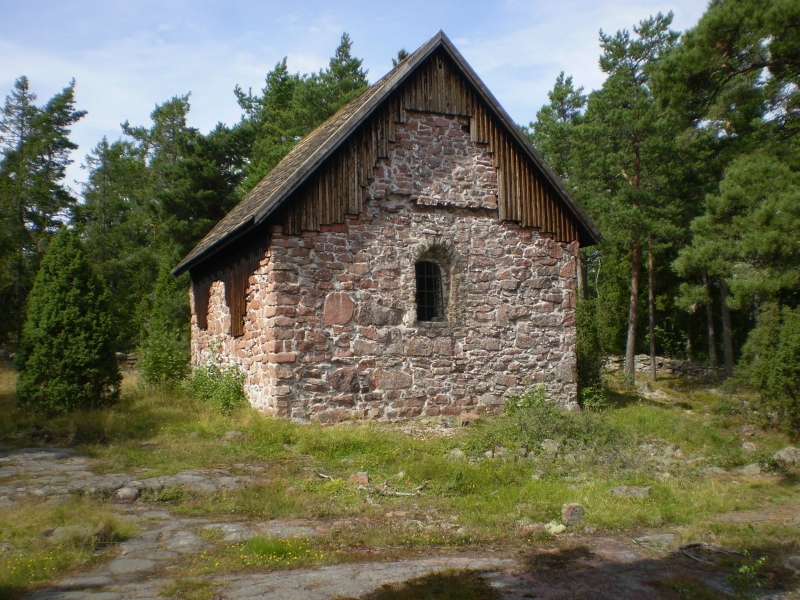
St. Olof's Chapel

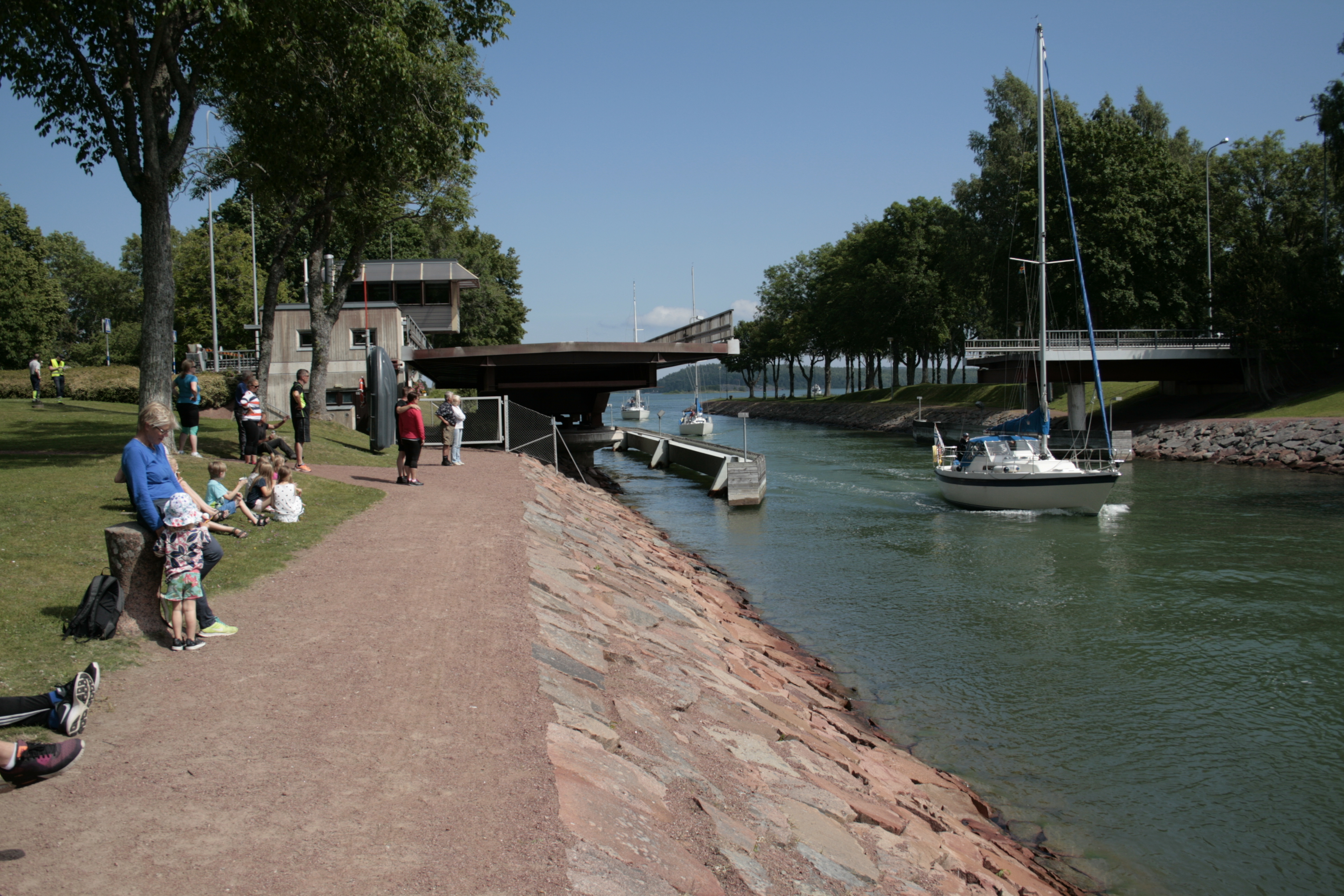
Lemström Canal

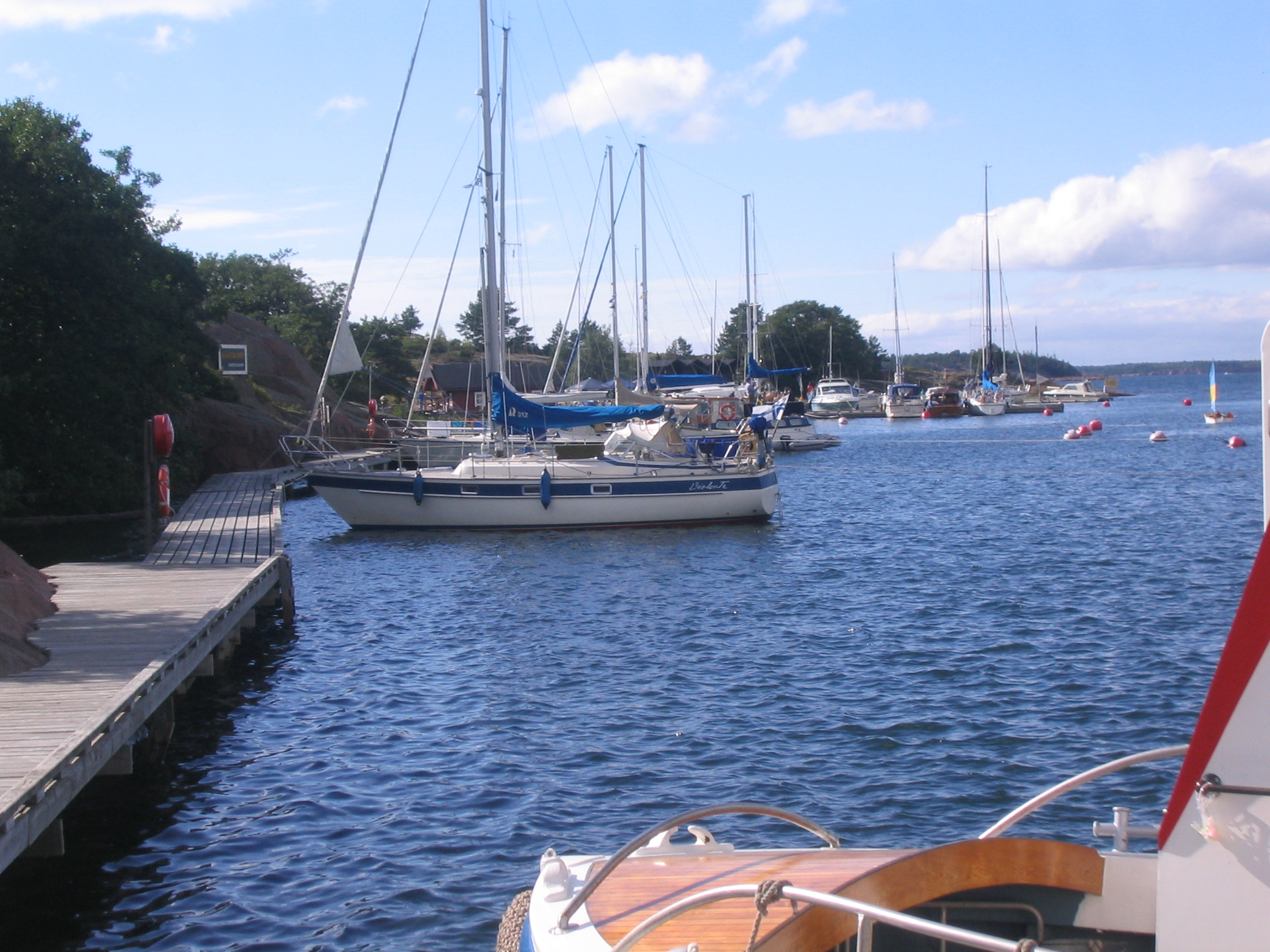
Rödhamn Harbour.

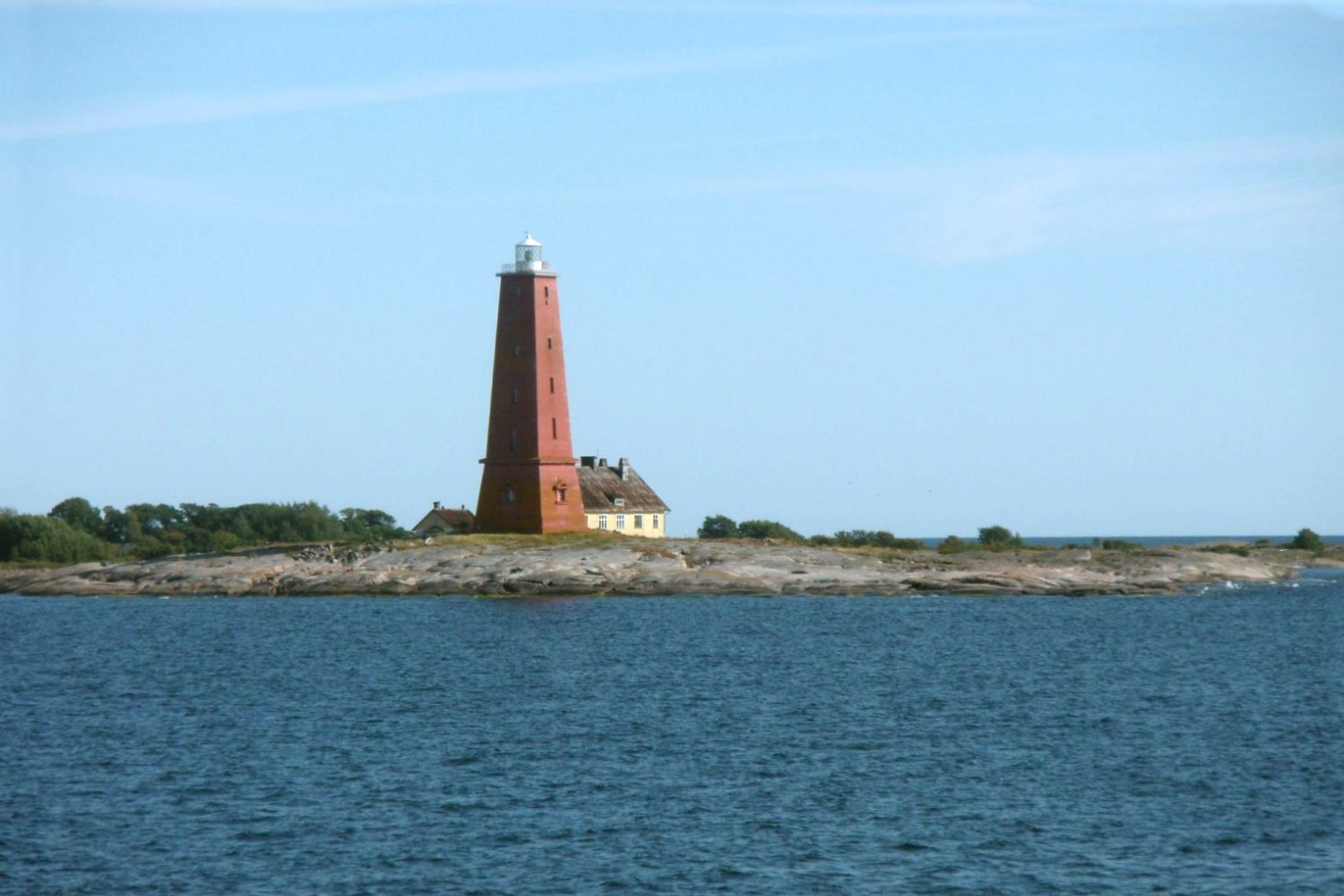
Lågskär Lighthouse

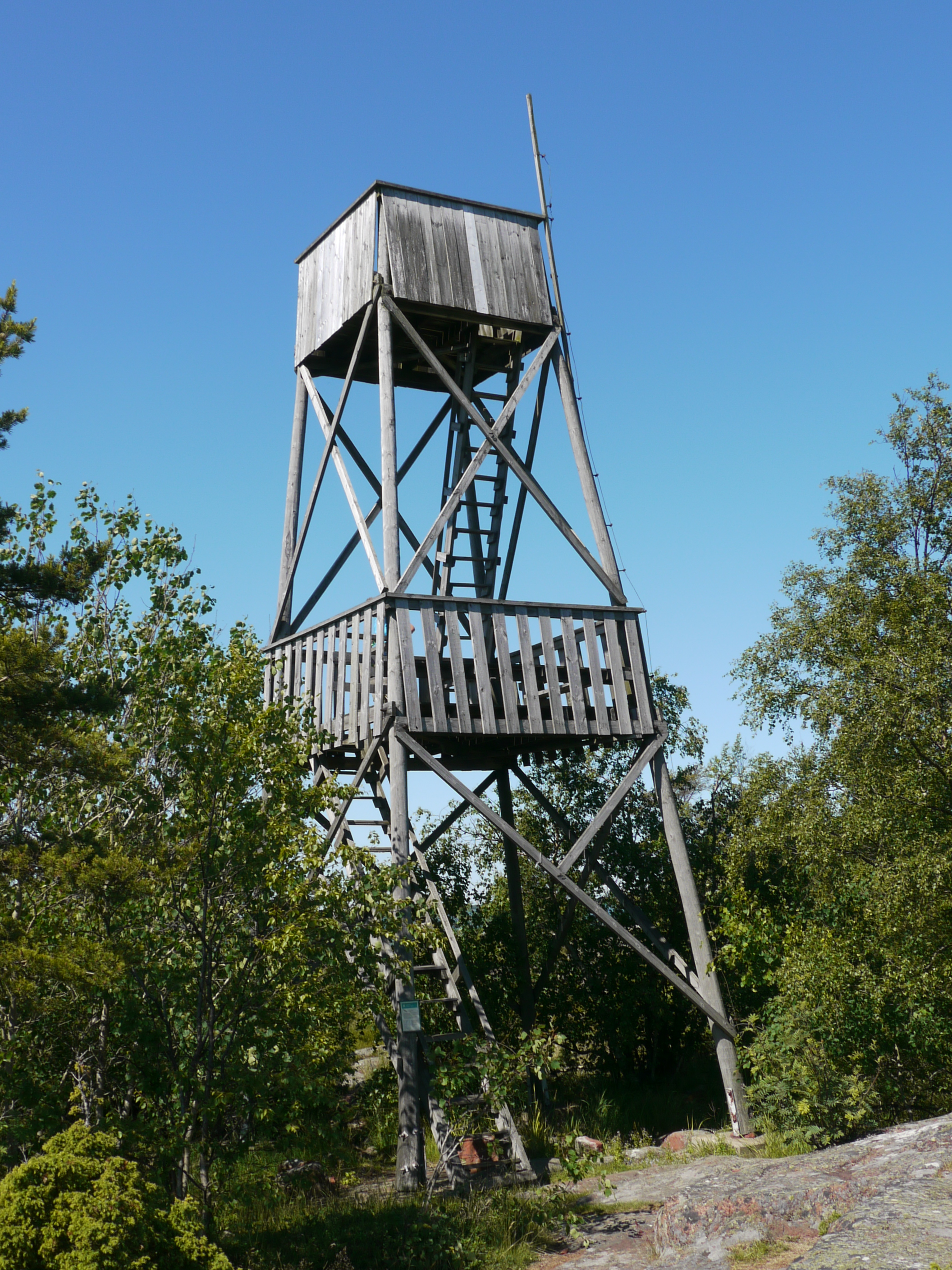
Tower of Herrö
