= Geta, Åland =

Geta
- Municipality
- Geta kommun
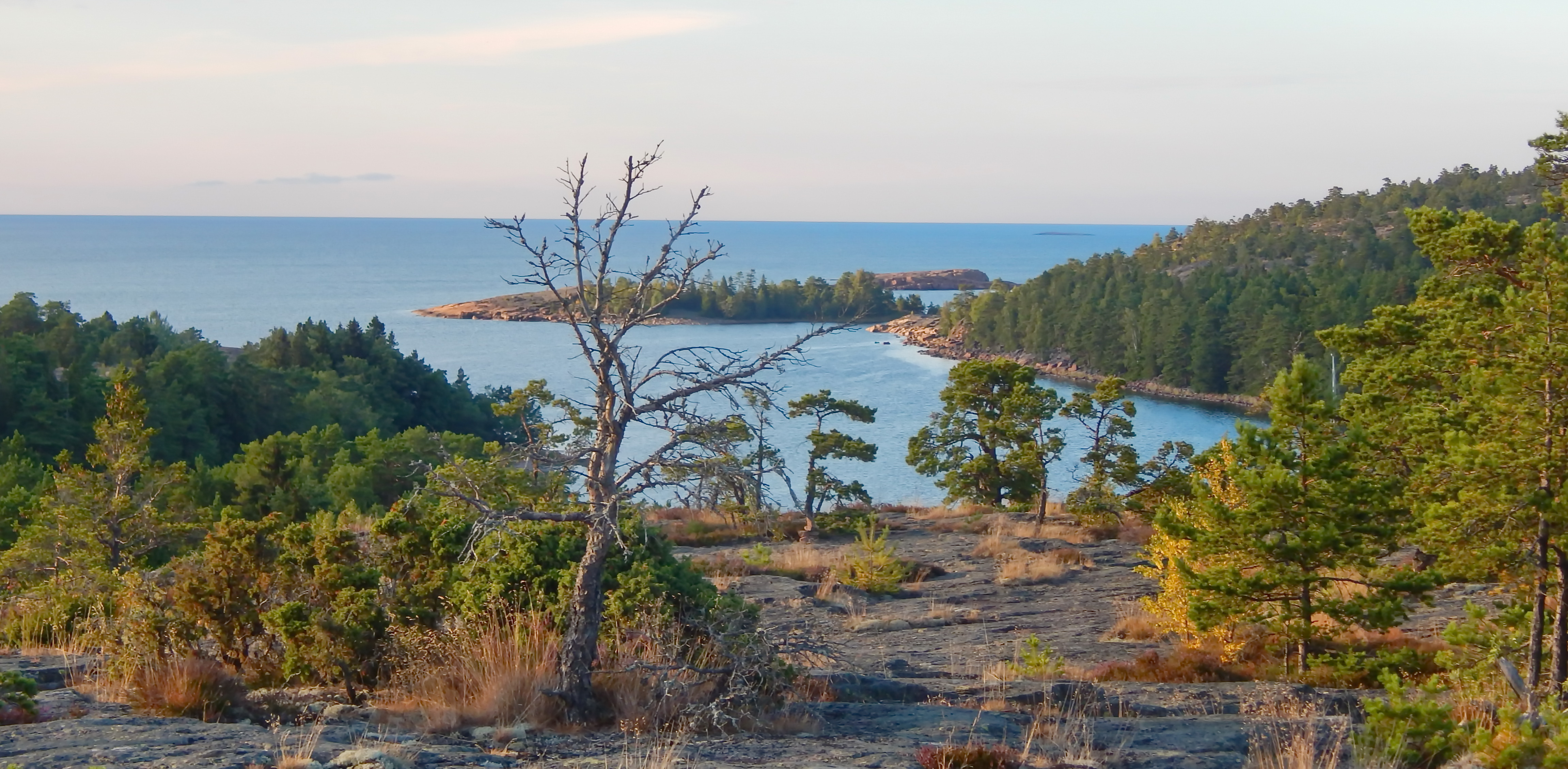
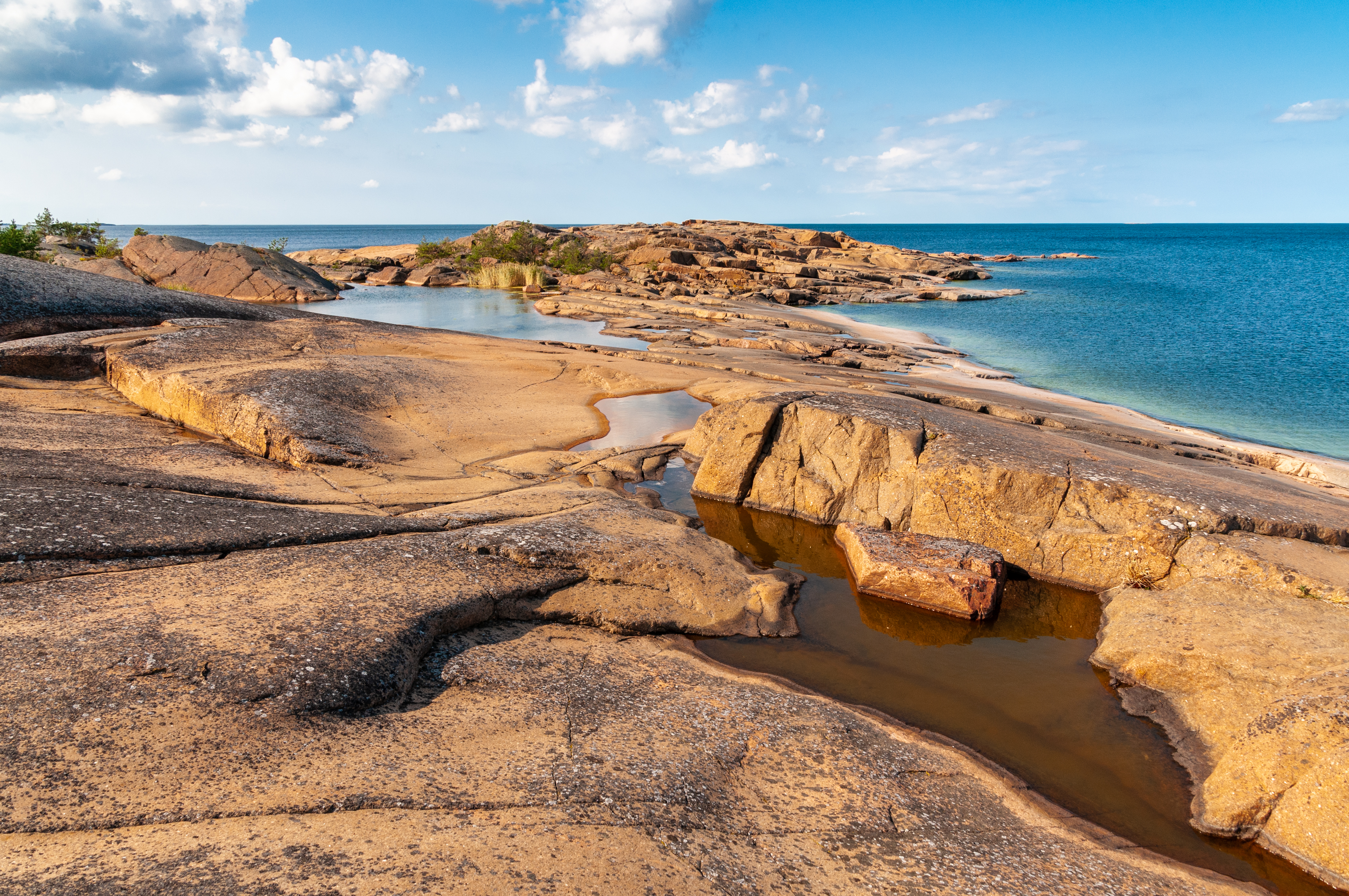
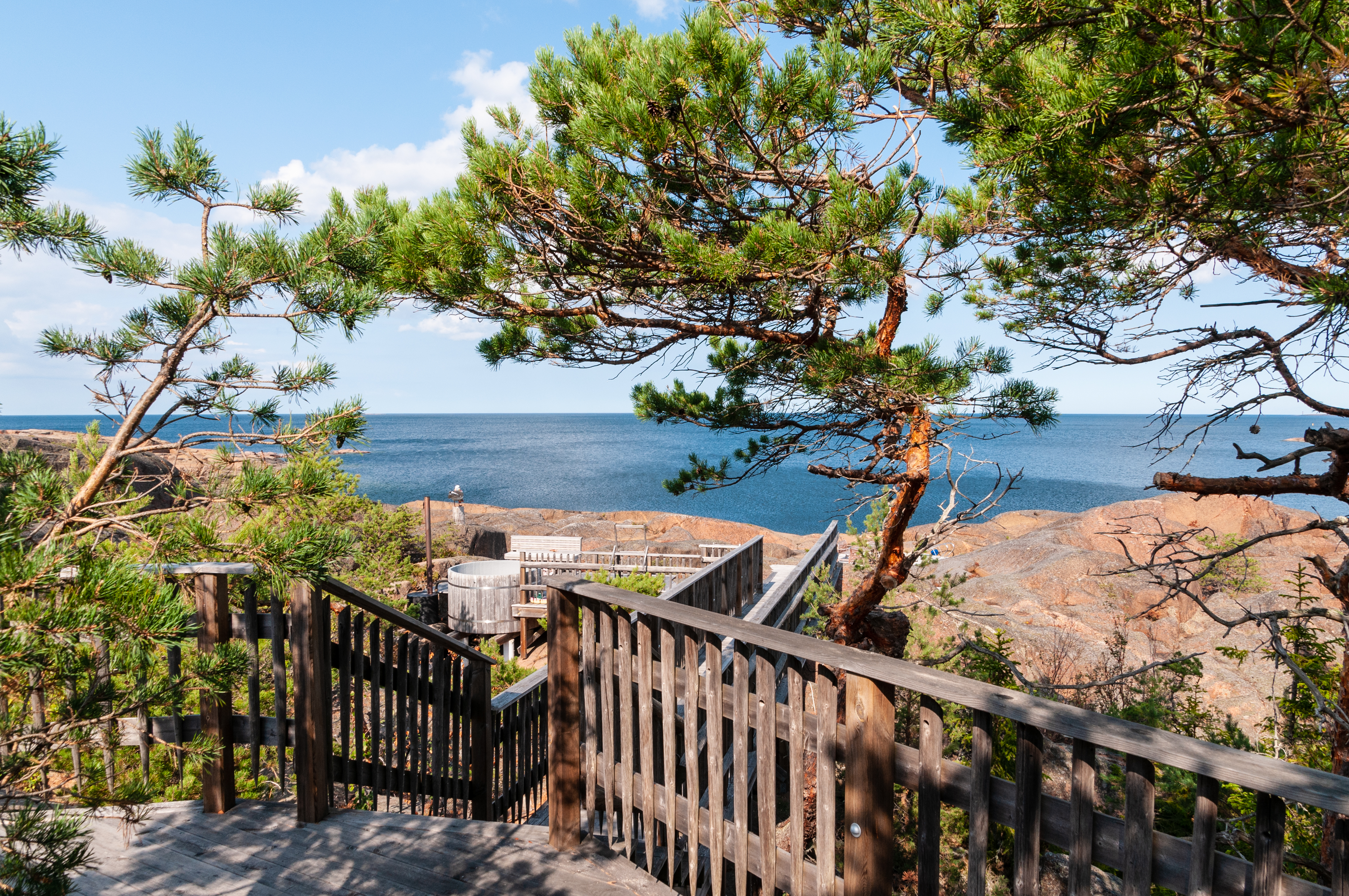
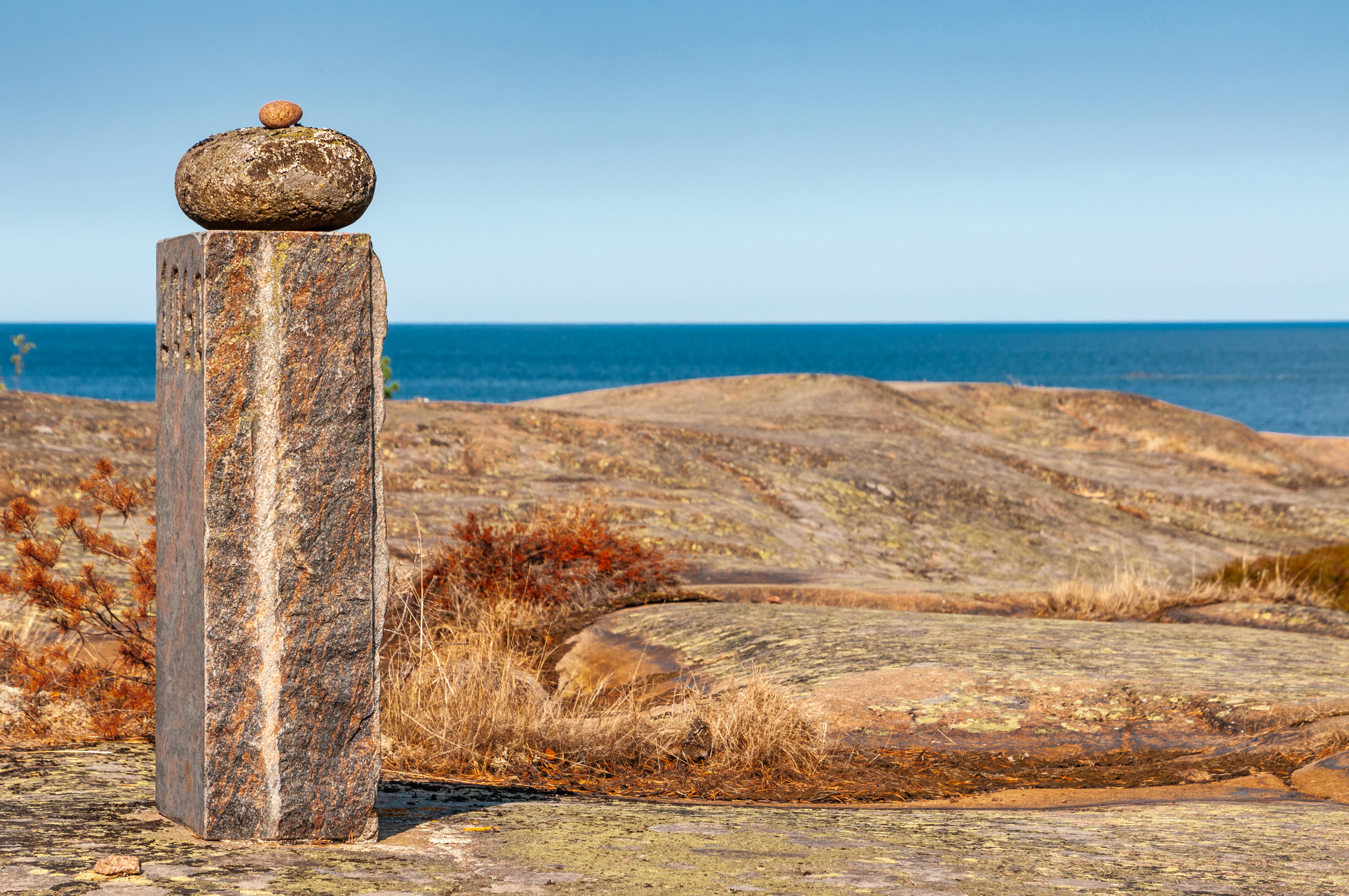
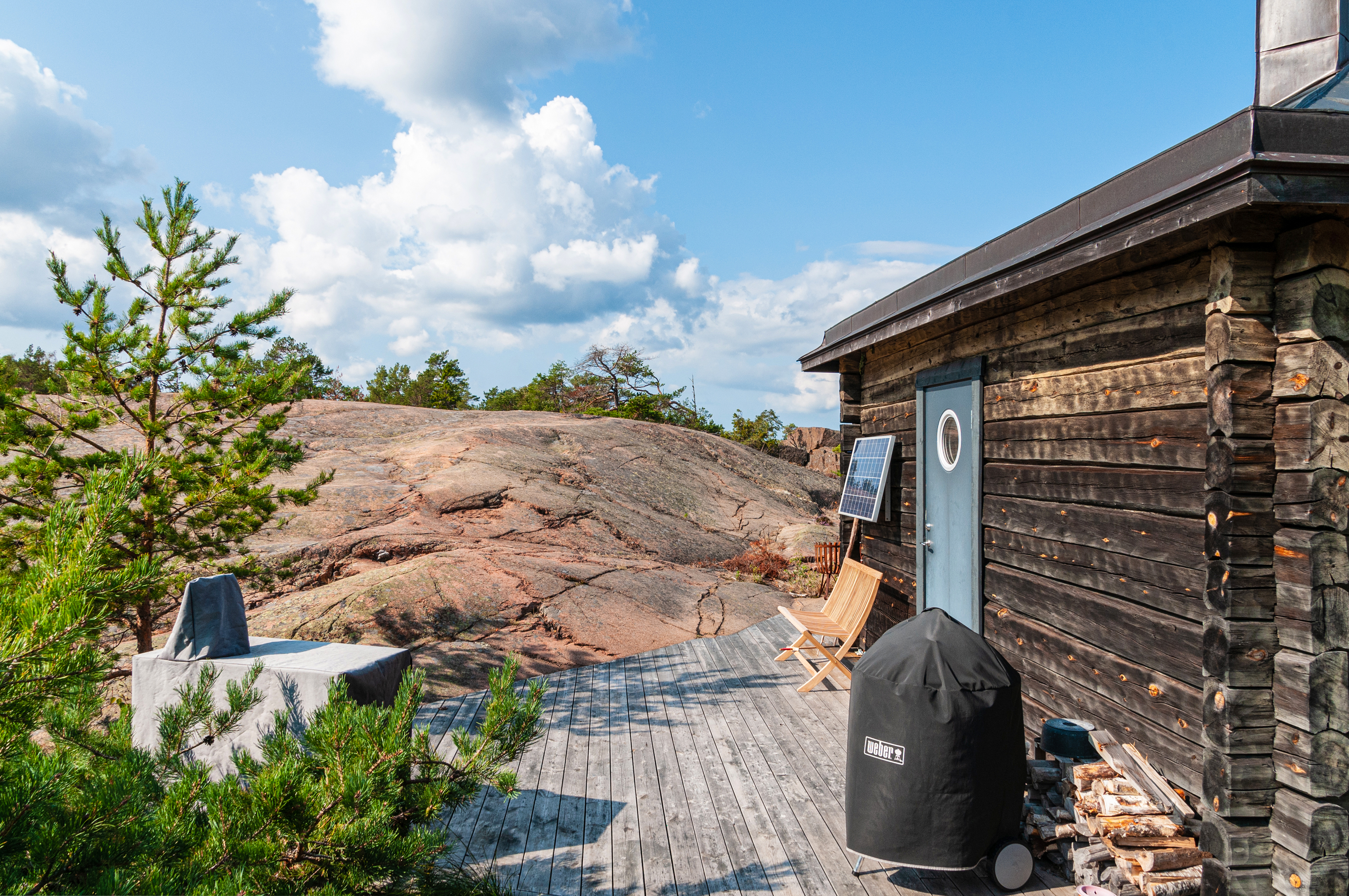
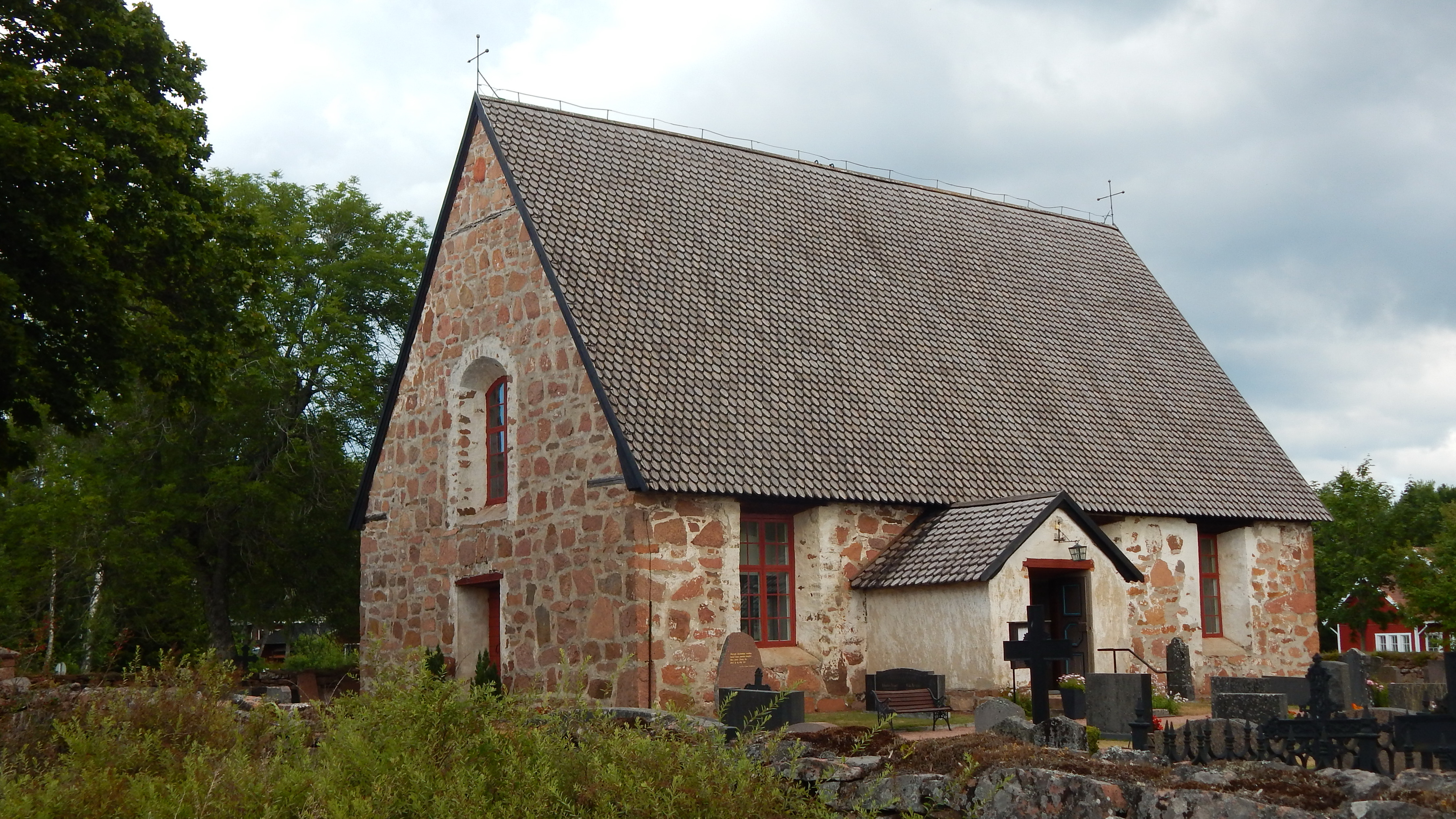
- Geta

- Coat of arms

- Location of Geta in Finland

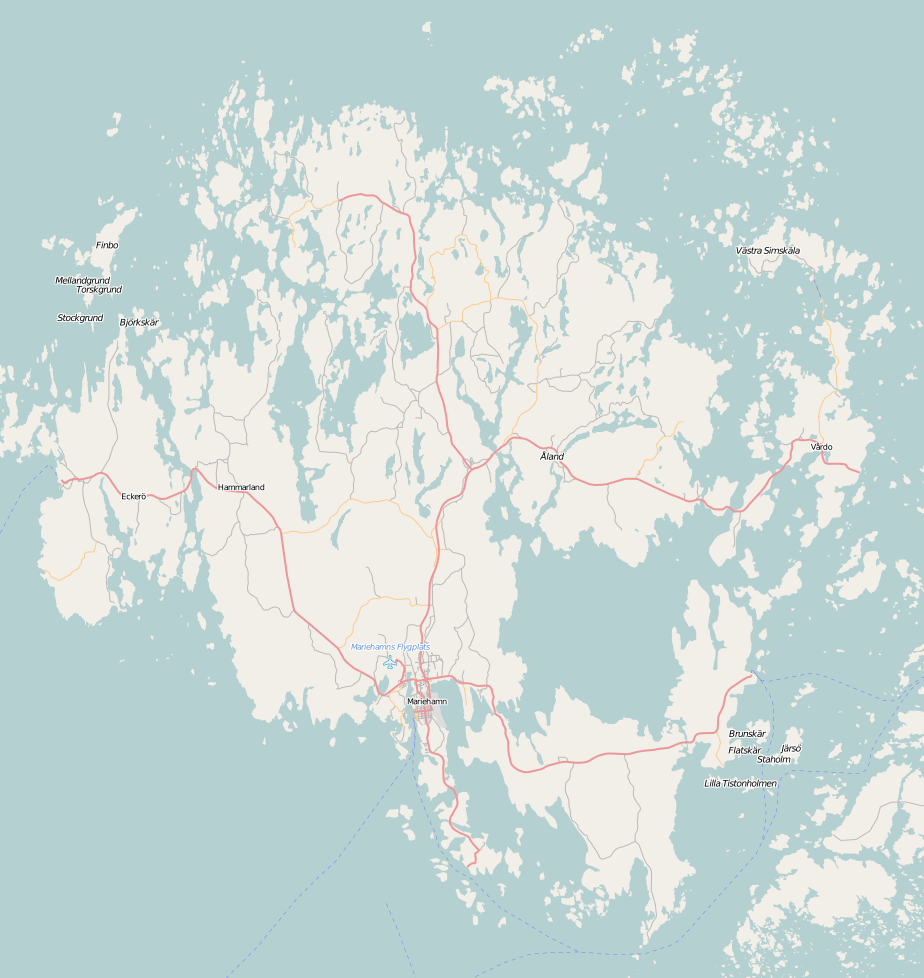
- Location in Åland
- Coordinates: 60°22.5′N 019°51′E
- Country: Finland
- Region: Åland
- Sub-region: Countryside

Government
  - Municipal manager: Gustav Blomberg

Area (2018-01-01)
  - Total: 605.99 km^{2} (233.97 sq mi)
  - Land: 84.55 km^{2} (32.64 sq mi)
  - Water: 522.14 km^{2} (201.60 sq mi)
  - Rank: 303rd largest in Finland

Population (2025-12-31)
  - Total: 512
  - Rank: 301st largest in Finland
  - Density: 6.06/km^{2} (15.7/sq mi)

Population by native language
  - Swedish: 81.6% (official)
  - Finnish: 3.7%
  - Others: 14.6%

Population by age
  - 0 to 14: 16.8%
  - 15 to 64: 60.9%
  - 65 or older: 22.3%
- Time zone: UTC+02:00 (EET)
  - Summer (DST): UTC+03:00 (EEST)
- Website: www.geta.ax

Geta (Swedish pronunciation: [ˈjeːta]) is a municipality in the northern part of Åland, an autonomous territory of Finland. The municipality has a population of 512 (31 December 2025) and covers an area of 605.99 square kilometres (233.97 sq mi) of which 522.14 km^{2} (201.60 sq mi) is water. The population density is 6.06 inhabitants per square kilometre (15.7/sq mi).

Its neighboring municipalities are Finström, Hammarland and Saltvik. The municipality is unilingually Swedish.

Håkan Skogsjö has documented the permanently residing population of Geta from the 17th century to the present, covering the history of the municipality as a whole, its individual hamlets, down to each original farmstead and the families who lived there.

== See also ==
- Åland Islands Highway 4
