= Sund, Åland =

Sund
- Municipality
- Sunds kommun
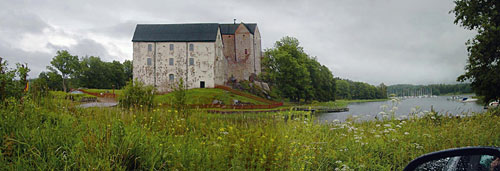
- Kastelholm Castle in 2004

- Coat of arms

- Location of Sund in Finland

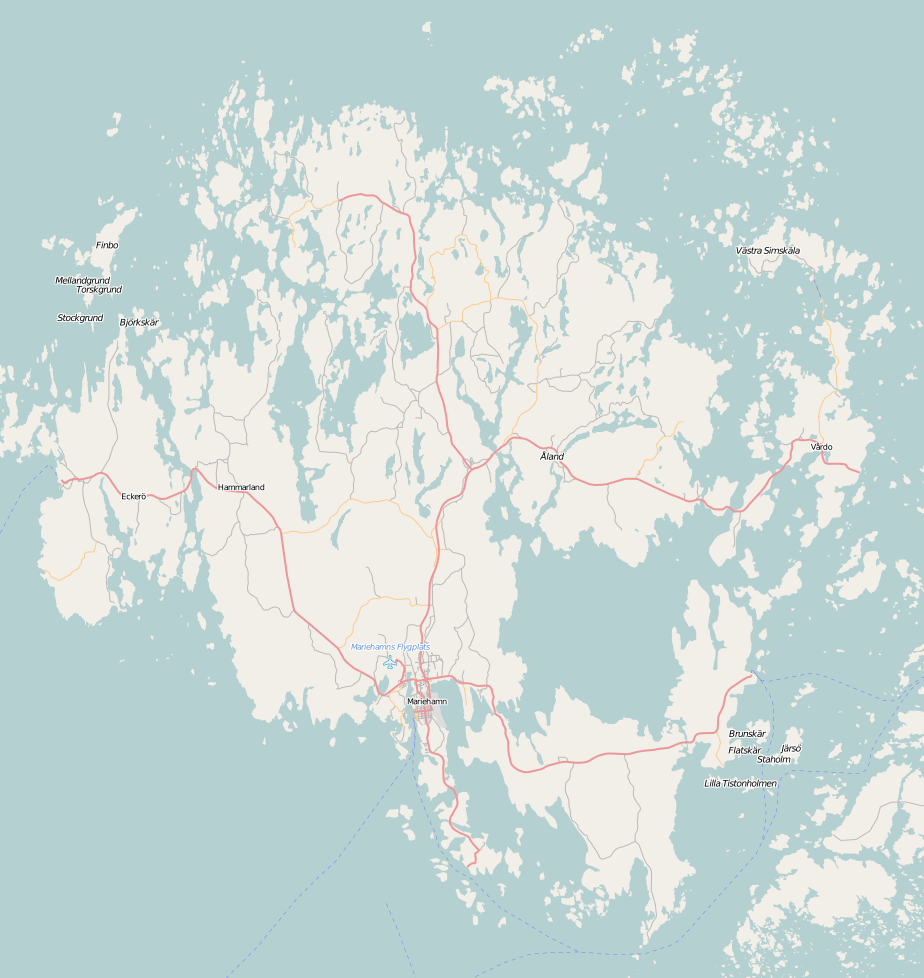
- Location in Åland
- Coordinates: 60°15′N 020°07′E
- Country: Finland
- Region: Åland
- Sub-region: Countryside

Government
  - Municipal manager: Andreas Johansson

Area (2018-01-01)
  - Total: 184.32 km^{2} (71.17 sq mi)
  - Land: 108.21 km^{2} (41.78 sq mi)
  - Water: 76.06 km^{2} (29.37 sq mi)
  - Rank: 295th largest in Finland

Population (2025-12-31)
  - Total: 1,018
  - Rank: 292nd largest in Finland
  - Density: 9.41/km^{2} (24.4/sq mi)

Population by native language
  - Swedish: 87.9% (official)
  - Finnish: 4.2%
  - Others: 7.9%

Population by age
  - 0 to 14: 15.5%
  - 15 to 64: 58.3%
  - 65 or older: 26.2%
- Time zone: UTC+02:00 (EET)
  - Summer (DST): UTC+03:00 (EEST)
- Website: www.sund.ax

Sund is a municipality of Åland. It is an autonomous territory of Finland, and one of the official 27 national landscapes of Finland.

The municipality has a population of 1,018 (31 December 2025) and covers an area of 184.32 square kilometres (71.17 sq mi) of which 76.06 km^{2} (29.37 sq mi) is water. The population density is 9.41 inhabitants per square kilometre (24.4/sq mi).

The municipality is unilingually Swedish-speaking with around 88.41% of the residents of Sund speaking the Swedish language as their mother tongue. Only 4.40% of the residents of Sund speak the Finnish language as their mother tongue. Sund is the third most Swedish-speaking municipality within Finland.

The old Medieval post route from Stockholm, Sweden to Turku, Finland passes through Sund.

== History ==
Sund was not populated by humans until the Bronze Age, however a permanent settlement was only first established in the 5th century by the Swedes. It is suspected that there may have been a partial Finnish settlement due to the existence of a village called Finby.

The Sund church was built by the end of the 13th century and the Kastelholm Castle was also built at the end of the 14th century on a small island and it became the administrative centre of the Åland region until losing importance in 1634 and later on in 1745 following country reforms and fire damage. King John III of Sweden kept his deposed brother Eric XIV in captivity in the Kastelholm castle in Autumn 1571. Sund is estimated to have had around 900 inhabitants in 1571 in accordance to the Silver Tax List of that same year.

Following the Russian victory in the Finnish War of 1808-1809, the Russians began to build the Bomarsund Fortress in Sund in 1832 in accordance with the orders of Tsar Nicholas I to strengthen the western border, however when the Crimean War began the Fortress was only half-finished, the Bommarsund Fortress surrendered to British forces, who demolished it. In the Treaty of Paris, it was concluded that the Åland islands is not to be fortified.

Håkan Skogsjö has documented the permanently residing population of Sund from the 17th century to the present, covering the history of the municipality as a whole, its individual hamlets, down to each original farmstead and the families who lived there.

== Economy ==
Tourism is one of the biggest lines of business in Sund. Agriculture is also popular, especially keeping livestock. Small businesses are also abundant and the biggest employers are the municipality and the local golf course.

== Demographics ==
=== Population ===
Sund had a small population of around 1020 in 2020, however it lowered to 995 in 2023. Sund is a municipality with no urban areas. At the end of 2017, there were 1,031 inhabitants in Sund, of which 1,019 lived in sparsely populated areas and the residences of 12 were unknown. Sund has 28 villages within its municipality: Berg, Björby, Bomarsund, Brändbolstad, Domarböle, Finby, Gesterby, Gunnarsby, Hulta, Högbolstad, Jussböle, Kastelholm; Kulla, Lappböle, Lövvik, Mångstekta, Persby, Prästgården, Rosenberg, Sibby, Smedsböle, Strömbolstad, Sundby, Svensböle, Tosarby, Tranvik, Träsk and Vivasteby.

Population size 1980–2020
Year	Population
1980	939
1985	920
1990	948
1995	968
2000	1,013
2005	1,031
2010	1,019
2015	1,031
2020	1,020
2023	995

== Politics ==
In the 2023 legislative elections, Sund voted as such:

- Åland Centre – 29.8%
- Non-aligned Coalition – 24.4%
- Liberals for Åland – 22.5%
- Åland Social Democrats – 10.6%
- Moderate Coalition for Åland – 6.5%
- Sustainable Initiative – 4.3%
- Future of Åland – 1.9%

== Notable people ==
- G. A. Wallin (1811–1852), explorer and orientalist

== Image gallery ==
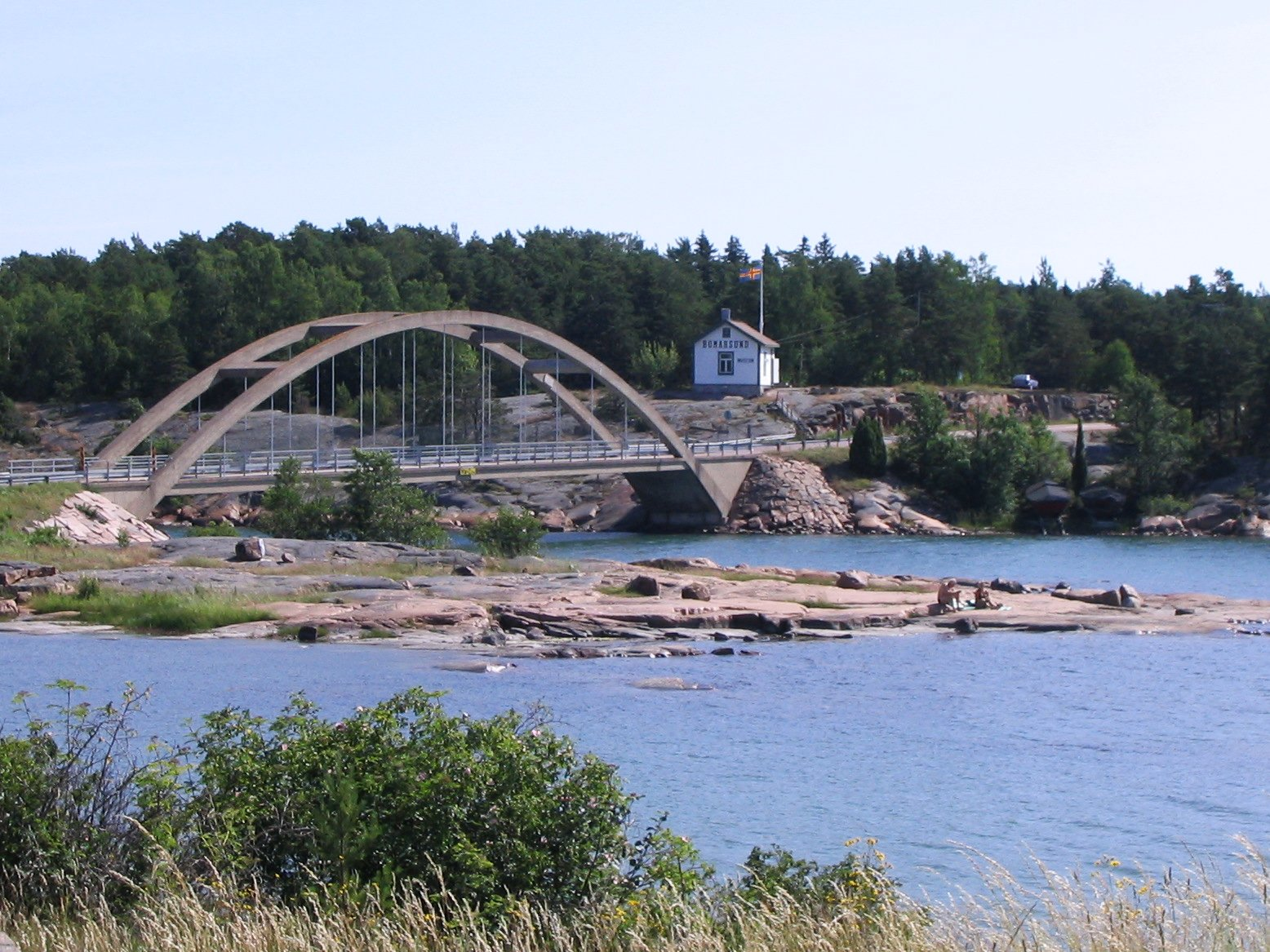
Bridge to Prästö in Sund municipality

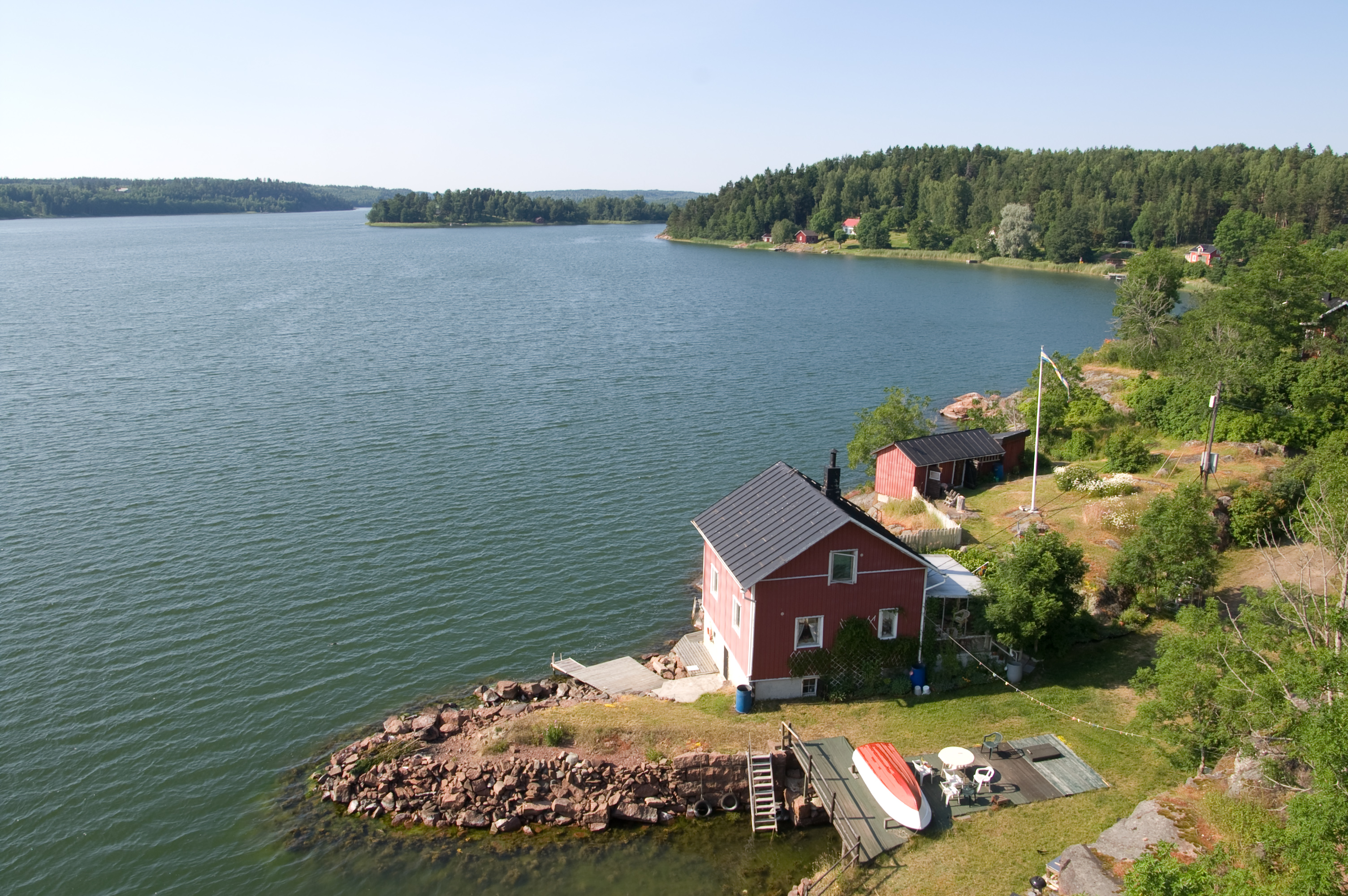
View from the bridge between Sund and Finström

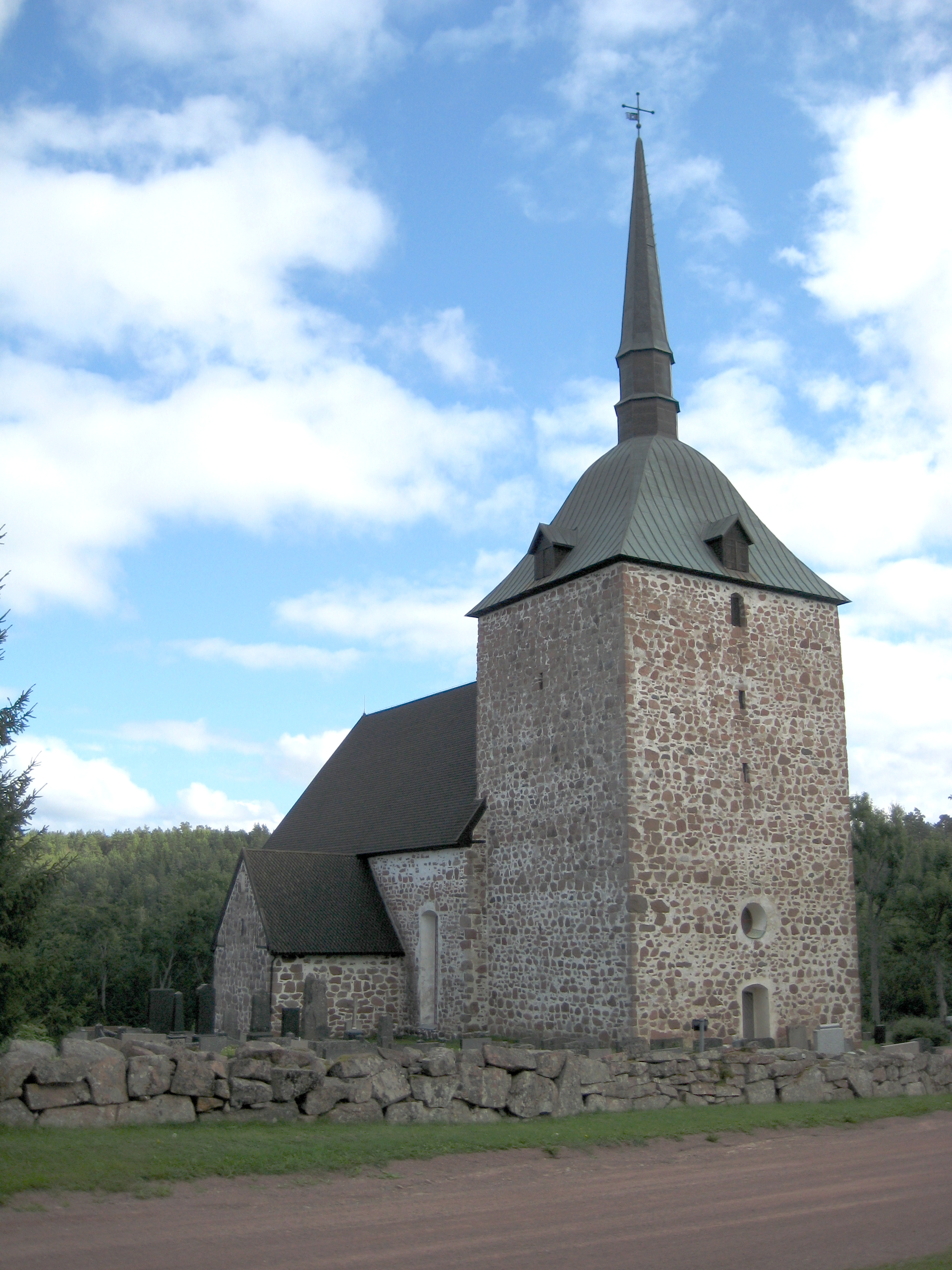
Church of Sund parish

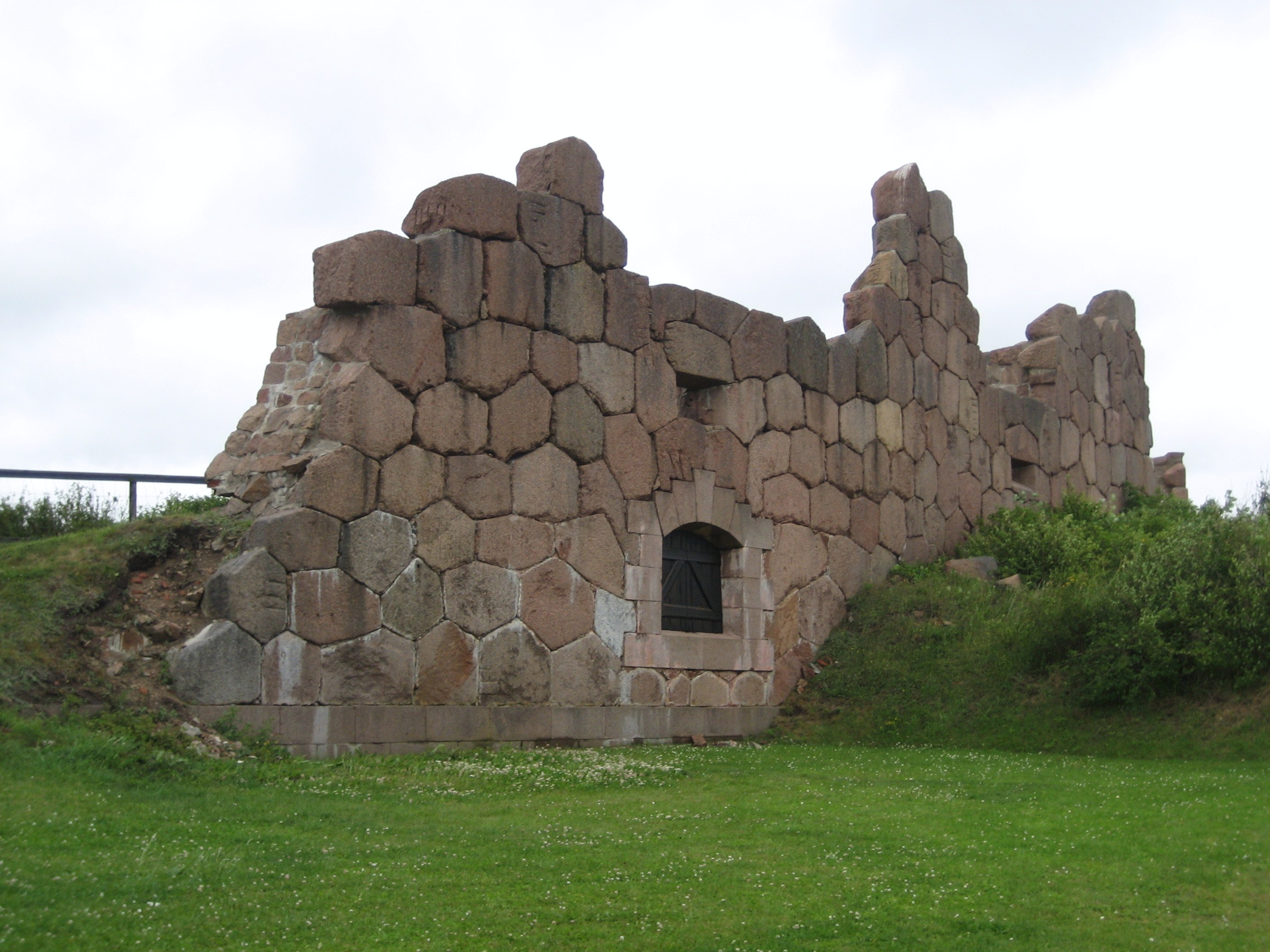
Bomarsund, Åland
