= List of medieval stone churches in Finland =

This is a list of medieval stone churches in Finland. A total number of 104 fieldstone churches were built between the 13th and 16th century, of which 83 have been preserved. Numbers include the sacristies of uncompleted churches as well as three churches in Vyborg which is now part of Russia.

The construction years for each church are listed in accordance with Suomen keskiajan kivikirkot ('Finnish Medieval Stone Churches') by historian Markus Hiekkanen. The book, first published in 2003, builds on the chronology first put forth in Hiekkanen's 1994 doctoral thesis "The Stone Churches of the Medieval Diocese of Turku: A Systematic Classification and Chronology." Until Hiekkanen's research, which is based in statistical interpretation of field observations using "a systematic database of comparative criteria," most of the churches were generally considered 100–200 years older.

While Hiekkanen's dates represent those most frequently used by state museums and the Finnish Heritage Agency, his work is not universally accepted and scholars have disagreed with various elements of his research, including his methods and certain dates offered. Åsa Ringbom of Åbo Akademi University, an art historian and one of the principal researchers of the Åland Churches Project, has offered dates for the construction of the stone churches of Åland that, in some cases, differ from Hiekkanen's by a century or more. Hiekkanen has consistently dismissed the interdisciplinary methods used by Ringbom and his colleagues – which include a combined study of written sources, stylistic dating, archeological finds, dendrochronology, and mortar dating, among other modes – and, conversely, Ringbom has called into question Hiekkanen's lack of transparency regarding his methodological principals and limited incorporation of data which fall outside of his model.

The provinces in this list refer to the historical provinces of Finland, which were replaced by the regions of Finland in 1634, and differ from the former provinces of Finland, which were in use during 1634 to 2009.

The official international name for cities, towns and municipalities in bilingual Finland follows the naming of the majority language of that area. But using the other name version is equal. During historical period the naming was mainly the Swedish one. The list follows the main rule as giving the official name first. But also giving the name in the other official language in the following column. This is of significant help for the reader as the names might very a lot. Medieval churches are historical and that is the reason a few of the names in Swedish that are considered out of use nowadays are entered as this is the way the churches might originally be named in sources and literature.

== Number of churches by province ==
Province	Churches	Sacristies	Total
Finland Proper	26	4	30
Tavastia	13	6	19
Uusimaa	14	–	14
Satakunta	9	4	13
Åland	13	–	13
Ostrobothnia	7	1	8
Karelia	4	1	5
Savonia	–	1	1

== Finland Proper ==
Church	Church name based on the other official language of Finland	Image	Original parish	Parish named based the other official language of Finland	Current municipality	Municipality in the other official language of Finland	Built	Notes
Halikko Church	Swedish: Halikko Church		Halikko	(Swedish: Halikko)	Halikko	Swedish: Halikko	1460–1475	expanded 1813–1815
Kalanti Church	Swedish: Kaland Church		Kalanti	Swedish: Kaland	Uusikaupunki	Swedish: Nystad	1430–1450	
Kimito Church	Finnish: Kemiönsaari Church		Kimito	Finnish: Kemiö	Kimitoön	Swedish: Kemiönsaari	1460s	
Kisko Sacristy	Swedish: Kisko Sacristy		Kisko	Swedish: Kisko	Kisko	Swedish: Kisko	1510–1530	
Koroinen Church	Swedish: Korois Church		Diocese of Finland	Diocese of Finland	Turku	Swedish: Åbo	1266–1286	foundations, destroyed 1396
Korpo Church	Finnish: Korppoo Church		Korpo	Finnish: Korppoo	Pargas	Finnish: Parainen	1430s–1440s	
Laitila Church	Swedish: Letala Church		Laitila	Swedish: Letala	Laitila	Swedish: Letala	1460–1483	
Lemu Church	Swedish: Lemu Church		Lemu	Swedish: Lemu	Masku	Swedish: Masku	1460–1480	
Lieto Church	Swedish: Lundo Church		Lieto	Swedish: Lundo	Lieto	Swedish: Lundo	1470s–1480s	
Marttila Sacristy	Swedish: S:t Mårtens acristy		Marttila	(Swedish: S:t Mårtens	Marttila	Swedish: S:t Mårtens	1500–1540	ruins
Masku Church	Swedish: Masku Church		Masku	Swedish: Masku formerly in Swedish Masko	Masku	Swedish: Masku Formerly in Swedish Masko	1490–1510	
Mynämäki Church	Swedish: Virmo Church		Mynämäki	Swedish: Virmo	Mynämäki	Swedish: Virmo	1425–1440	
Naantali Church	Swedish: Nådendals Church		Nådendal Abbey	Swedish: Nådendal Abbey	Naantali	Swedish: Nådendal	1480s	
Nagu Church	Finnish: Nauvo Church		Nagu	Finnish: Nauvo	Nagu	Finnish: Nauvo	1430–1450	
Nousiainen Church	Swedish: Nousis Church		Nousiainen	Swedish: Nousis	Nousiainen	Swedish: Nousis	1420s–1430s	
Pargas Church	Finnish: Parainen Church		Pargas	(Finnish: Parainen]	Pargas	Finnish: Parainen	1440s/1450s	
Perniö Church	Swedish: Bjärnå Church		Perniö	(Swedish: Bjärnå	Salo	Salo	1460–1480	
Pertteli Church	Swedish: S:t Bertils Church		Pertteli	Swedish: S:t Bertils	Salo	Salo	1500–1520	
Piikkiö Sacristy	Swedish: Pikis Sacristy		Piikkiö	Swedish: Pikis	Kaarina	Swedish: S:t Karins	1500–1560	demolished, no remains found
Pöytyä Sacristy	Finnish: Pöytis Sacristy		Pöytyä	Swedish: Pöytis	Pöytyä	Swedish: Pöytis	1500–1560	demolished 1805, no remains found
Raisio Church	Swedish: Reso Church		Raisio	Swedish: Reso	Raisio	Swedish: Reso	1500–1520	
Rusko Church	Swedish: Rusko Church		Rusko	Swedish: Rusko	Rusko	Swedish: Rusko	1510–1530	
Rymättylä Church	Swedish: Rimito Church		Rymättylä	Swedish: Rimito	Naantali	Swedish: Nådendal	1510s	
Sauvo Church	Swedish: Sagu Church		Sauvo	Swedish: Sagu	Sauvo	Swedish: Sagu	1460–1472	
St. Ann's Chapel	Swedish: S:t Annas Chapel		Uskela	Swedish: Uskela	Salo	Swedish: Salo, Finland	1500–1520	demolished 1832, memorial 1953
St. Catherine's Church	Swedish: S:ta Catherin's Church		Turku	Swedish: Åbo	Turku	Swedish: Åbo	1440s–1450s	
St. Mary's Church	Swedish: S:t Marie Church		Maaria	Swedish: S:t Marie	Turku	Swedish: Åbo	1440s	
Taivassalo Church	Swedish: Tövsala Church		Taivassalo	Swedish: Tövsala	Taivassalo	Swedish: Tövsala	1425–1440	
Turku Cathedral	Swedish: Åbo Cathedral		Archdiocese of Turku	Swedish: Archdiocese of Åbo	Turku	Swedish: Åbo	1400s–1410s	
Turku Dominican Church	Swedish: Åbo Dominican Church		Dominican Convent in Turku	Dominican convent in Åbo, Finland	Turku	Swedish: Åbo	1430s	no wisible remains. Place known under present street
Vehmaa Church	(Swedish: Vemo Church)		Vehmaa	Swedish: Vemo	Vehmaa	Swedish: Vemo	1425–1440	

== Karelia ==
Church	Church name based on the other official language of Finland	Image	Original parish	Parish name based on the other official language of Finland	Current municipality	Municipality in the other official language	Built	Notes
Dominican Church of Vyborg	Swedish: Dominican Church of Viborg		Dominican Convent in Vyborg	Swedish: Dominican Convent in Viborg	Vyborg	Swedish: Viborg	1481	destroyed by fire 1738, rebuilt 1828–1833, destroyed by fire 1989
Franciscan Church of Vyborg	Franciscan Church of Viborg		Franciscan Convent in Viborg	Swedish: Franciscan Convent in Viborg	Vyborg	Swedish: Viborg	1495–1497	demolished 1741
St. Mary's Church	Swedish: S:ta Maria Church, Fredrikshamn		Vehkalahti	Swedish: Veckelax	Hamina	Swedish: Fredrikshamn	1430–1470	destroyed by fire 1821, rebuilt
Virolahti Sacristy	Swedish: Vederlax Sacristy		Virolahti	Swedish: Vederlax	Virolahti	Swedish: Vederlax	1500–1530	
Vyborg Old Cathedral	Swedish: Viborg Old Cathedral		Vyborg	Swedish: Viborg	Vyborg	Swedish: Viborg	1435–1445	ruins, destroyed 1940

== Ostrobothnia ==
Church	Church name based on the other official language in Finland	Image	Original parish	Parish name based on the other official language in Finland	Current municipality	Munisipality in the other official language in Finland	Built	Notes
Alatornio Church	Swedish: Nedertorneå Church		Alatornio	Swedish: Nedertorneå	Tornio	Swedish: Torneå	1500–1513	expanded 1794–1797
Isokyrö Old Church	Swedish: Storkyro Old Church		Isokyrö	Swedish: Storkyro	Isokyrö	Swedish: Storkyro	1513–1533	
Kaarlela Church	Karleby Church		Kaarlela	Swedish: Karleby	Kokkola	Swedish: Gamlakarelby	1500–1530	expanded 1788–1789
Keminmaa Church	Swedish: Keminmaa Church		Kemi	Swedish: Kemi	Keminmaa	Swedish: Keminmaa	1520–1553	
Närpes Church	Finnish: Närpiö Church		Närpes	Finnish: Närpiö	Närpes	Finnish: Närpiö	1550–1555	
Pedersöre Church	Finnish: Different names during centuries Pietarsaaren maalaisseurakunta Church nowadays Pedersöre Church		Pedersöre	Finnish: Pedersöre or earlier Pietarsaari maalaiskunta	Jakobstad	Finnish: Pietarsaari	1510–1520	expanded 1787–1795
St. Mary's Church	Swedish: St. Mary's Church, Vasa		Korsholm	Finnish: Mustasaari	Vaasa	Swedish: Vasa	1500–1520	ruins, destroyed by fire 1852
Vörå Sacristy	Finnish: Vöyri Sacristy		Vörå	Finnish: Vöyri	Vörå	Finnish: Vöyri	1519–1522	ruins beneath the 1626 church

== Satakunta ==
Church	Church name based on the second official language in Finland	Image	Original parish	Parish name based on the second official language in Finland	Current municipality	Municipality in the other official language in Finland	Built	Notes
Church of the Holy Cross	Swedish: Helga korskyrkan Church		Franciscan Convent in Rauma	Swedish: Franciscan Convent in Raumo	Rauma	Swedish: Raumo	1515–1520	
Huittinen Church	Swedish: Vittis Church		Huittinen	Swedish: Vittis	Huittinen	Swedish: Vittis	1500	expanded 1793 and 1860
Kokemäki Sacristy	Swedish: Kumo		Kokemäki	Swedish: Kumo	Kokemäki	Swedish: Kumo	1500–1540	
Köyliö Sacristy	Swedish: Kjulo Sacristy		Köyliö	Swedish: Kjulo	Köyliö	Swedish: Kjulo	early 16th century	no remains found
Lempäälä Church	Swedish: Lembois Church		Lempäälä	Swedish: Lembois	Lempäälä	Swedish: Lembois	1502–1505	expanded 1806 and 1835–1838
Loimaa Sacristy	Swedish: Loimaa Sacristy or Loimijoki Sacristy		Loimaa	Swedish: Loimaa	Loimaa	Swedish: Loimaa	1500–1560	demolished 1751, no remains found
Messukylä Old Church	Swedish: Messuby Old Church		Messukylä	Swedish: Messuby	Tampere	Swedish: Tammerfors	1510–1530	
Nokia Manor Chapel	Swedish: Nokia gård´s Church		Nokia Manor	Swedish: Nokia Gård	Nokia	Swedish: Nokia	1505–1529	foundations, demolished 1760s
Sastamala Church	Swedish: Sastamala Church		Karkku	Swedish: Karkku	Sastamala	Swedish: Karkku	1497–1505	
St. Olaf's Church	Swedish: St. Olaf's Church		Tyrvää	Swedish: Tyrvis	Sastamala	Swedish: Sastamala	1506–1516	interior destroyed by fire 1997
St. Olaf's Church	St. Olaf's Church		Ulvila	Swedish: Ulvsby	Ulvila	Swedish: Ulvsby	1495–1510	
Trinity Church	Swedish: Treenighets Church		Rauma	Swedish: Raumo	Rauma	Swedish: Raumo	1495–1505	ruins, destroyed by fire 1640
Vesilahti Sacristy	Swedish: Vesilax Sacristy		Vesilahti	Swedish: Vesilax	Vesilahti	Swedish: Vesilax	1485–1500	demolished 1839

== Savonia ==
Church	Church name based on the second official language in Finland	Image	Original parish	Parish namne based on the socond official language in Finland	Current municipality	Municipality inte the secon official langiage in Finland	Built	Notes
Savilahti Stone Sacristy	Swedish: Savilax Stone Sacristy		Savilahti	Swedish: Savilax	Mikkeli	Swedish: St Michel	1520–1560	abandoned 18th century, restored 1901

== Tavastia ==
Church	Church name based on the second official language in Finland	Image	Original parish	Original Parish name based on the second official language in Finland	Current municipality	Municipality name based on the second official language in Finland	Built	Notes
Akaa Sacristy	Swedish: Ackas Sacristy		Akaa	Swedish: Ackas	Akaa	Swedish: Ackas	ca. 1510	
Hauho Church	Swedish: Hauho Church		Hauho	Swedish: Hauho	Hämeenlinna	Swedish: Tavastehus	1500–1520	
Hollola Church	Swedish: Hollola Church		Hollola	Swedish: Hollola	Hollola	Swedish: Hollola	1495–1510	
Holy Cross Church	Swedish: Heliga Korset's Church		Hattula	Swedish: Hattula	Hattula	Swedish: Hattula	1472–1490	
Hämeenkoski Church	Swedish: Hämeenkoski Church		Koski Swedish: Koskis	Hämeenkoski	Swedish: Hämeenkoski	1510–1560	ruins, abandoned early 17th century	
Janakkala Church	Swedish: Janakkala Church		Janakkala	Swedish: Janakkala	Janakkala	Swedish: Janakkala	1510–1520	expanded 1840s
Kalvola Sacristy	Swedish: Kalvola Sacristy		Kalvola	Swedish: Kalvola	Hämeenlinna	Swedish: Tavastehus	1495–1505	
Lammi Church	Swedish: Lampis Church		Lammi	Swedish: Lampis	Hämeenlinna	Swedish: Tavastehus	1510s	
Padasjoki Sacristy	Swedish: Padasjoki Sacristy		Padasjoki	Swedish: Padasjoki	Padasjoki	Swedish: Padasjoki	1520–1560	demolished 1660s, present church 1670
Renko Church	Swedish: Rengo Church		Renko	Swedish: Rengo	Hämeenlinna	Swedish: Tavastehus	1510–1550	
Somero Sacristy	Swedish: Somero Sacristy		Somero	Swedish: Somero	Somero	Swedish: Somero	1490s	
St. Michael's Church	Swedish: St. Michael's Church, Pälkäne		Pälkäne	Swedish: Pälkäne	Pälkäne	Swedish: Pälkäne	1495–1505	ruins, abandoned 1839
Sysmä Church	Swedish: Sysmä Church		Sysma	Swedish: Sysmä	Sysmä	Swedish: Sysmä	1510–1520	expanded 1833–1834
Sääksmäki Church	Swedish: Sääksmäki Church		Sääksmäki	Swedish: Sääskmäki	Valkeakoski	Swedish: Valkeakoski	1495–1500	destroyed by fire 1929, rebuilt 1933
Tammela Church	Swedish: Tammela Church		Tammela	Swedish: Tammela	Tammela	Swedish: Tammela	1530–1550	
Tuulos Church	Swedish: Tuulos Church		Tuulos	Swedish: Tuulos	Hämeenlinna	Swedish: Tavastehus	1510–1540	
Tyrväntö Sacristy	Swedish: TYrväntö Sacristy or Tyrvändö Sacristy		Tyrväntö	Swedish: Tyrväntö or Tyrvändö	Hattula	Swedish: Hattula	early 16th century	
Urjala Sacristy	Swedish: Urjala Sacristy		Urjala	Swedish: Urjala	Urjala	Swedish: Urjala	1520–1540	
Vanaja Church	Swedish: Vånå Church		Vanaja	Swedish: Vånå	Hämeenlinna	1495–1510		

== Uusimaa ==
Church	Church name based on the second official language in Finland	Image	Original parish	Parish name based on the second official language in Finland	Current municipality	Municipality name in the second official language in Finland	Built	Notes
Espoo Cathedral	Swedish: Esbo Cathedral		Espoo	Swedish: Esbo	Espoo	Swedish: Esbo	1485–1490	expanded 1821–1823
Ingå Church	Finnish: Inkoo Church		Ingå	Swedish: Inkoo	Ingå	Swedish: Inkoo	1430–1520	
Karis Church	Finnish: Karjaa Church		Karis	Finnish: Karjaa	Raseborg	Finnish: Raasepori	1465–1470	
Kirkkonummi Church	Swedish: Kyrslätt Church		Kirkkonummi	Swedish: Kyrkslätt	Kirkkonummi	Swedish: Kyrkslätt	1400–1490	expanded 18th and 19th century
Lohja Church	Swedish: Lojo Church		Lohja	Swedish: Lojo	Lohja	Swedish: Lojo	1470–1490	
Pernå Church	Finnish: Pernaja Church		Pernå	Finnish: Pernaja	Loviisa	Swedish: Lovisa	1410–1442	
Pojo Church	Finnish: Pohja Church		Pojo	Finnish: Pohja	Raseborg	Finnish: Raasepori	1475–1480	
Porvoo Cathedral	Swedish: Borgå Cathedral		Porvoo	Swedish: Borgå	Porvoo	Swedish: Borgå	1414–1450	
Pyhtää Church	Swedish: Pyttis Church		Pyhtää	Swedish: Pyttis	Pyhtää	Swedish: Pyttis	1462	
Sipoo Old Church	Swedish: Sibbo gamla kyrka		Sipoo	Swedish: Sibbo	Sipoo	Swedish: Sibbo	1450–1454	
Siuntio Church	Swedish: Sjundeå Church		Siuntio	Swedish: Sjundeå	Siuntio	Swedish: Sjundeå	1460–1489	
Tenala Church	Finnish: Tenhola Church		Tenala	Finnish: Tenhola	Raseborg	Finnish: Raasepori	1460–1480	
Church of St. Lawrence	Swedish: Church of St. Lawrence, Vanda		Helsingin pitäjän kirkonkylä	Swedish: Helsinge	Vantaa	Swedish: Vanda	1450s	
Vihti Church	Swedish: Vichtis Church		Vihti	Swedish: Vichtis	Vihti	Swedish: Vichtis	1500–1520	ruins, abandoned 1801

== Åland ==
Åland is officially monolingual Swedish speaking and the names are just according to the Swedish language.

Church	Image	Original parish	Current municipality	Built	Notes
Church of St. Olaf		Jomala	Jomala	1275–1285	
Eckerö Church		Eckerö	Eckerö	1380–1420	
Finström Church		Finström	Finström	1440–1470	
Föglö Church		Föglö	Föglö	1500–1520	expanded 1859–1860
Geta Church		Geta	Geta	1510–1540	
Hammarland Church		Hammarland	Hammarland	14th century	
Kumlinge Church		Kumlinge	Kumlinge	1500–1510	
Kökar Church		Franciscan Convent in Kökar	Kökar	1500–1520	abandoned late 16th century, present church 1784
Lemböte Chapel		Lemland	Lemland	1500–1530	abandoned late 16th century, renovated 1890s
Lemland Church		Lemland	Lemland	1290–1310	
Saltvik Church		Saltvik	Saltvik	1350s–1370s	
Sund Church		Sund	Sund	late 13th century	
Vårdö Church		Vårdö	Vårdö	1520–1550	

== See also ==
- Architecture of Finland
