= Halikko Church =

Church in Halikko, Finland

Coordinates: 60°24′00″N 023°04′20″E

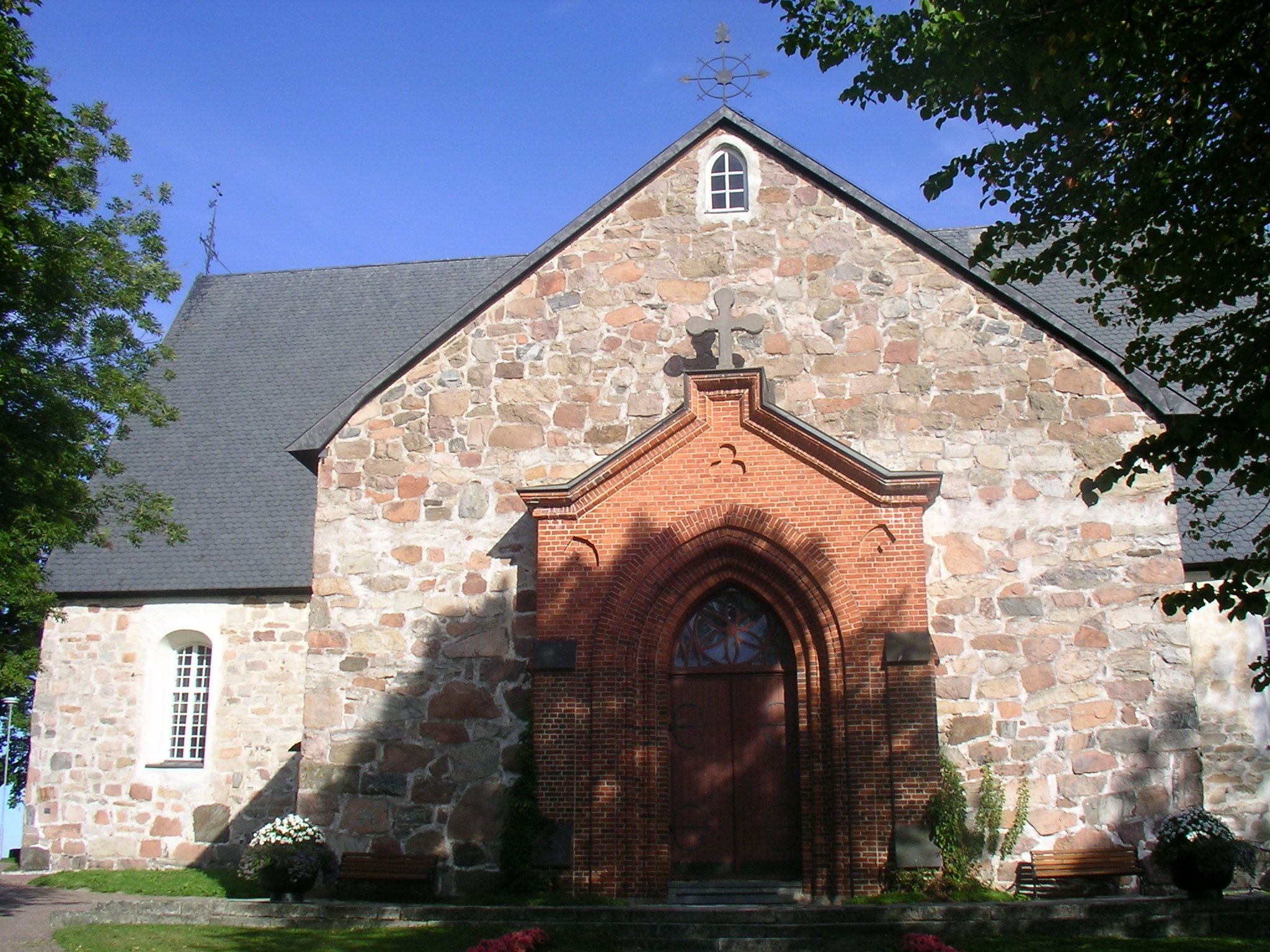
Gate to the church, called Gate of Åminne, because Graf of Åminne manor financed it

Halikko Church (Finnish: Halikon kirkko, Swedish: Halikko kyrka) is an Evangelical Lutheran church in Halikko, Finland. The first parts of the church were built in the 13th century, and Halikko Church is one of the 73 medieval stone churches of Finland.

== History ==
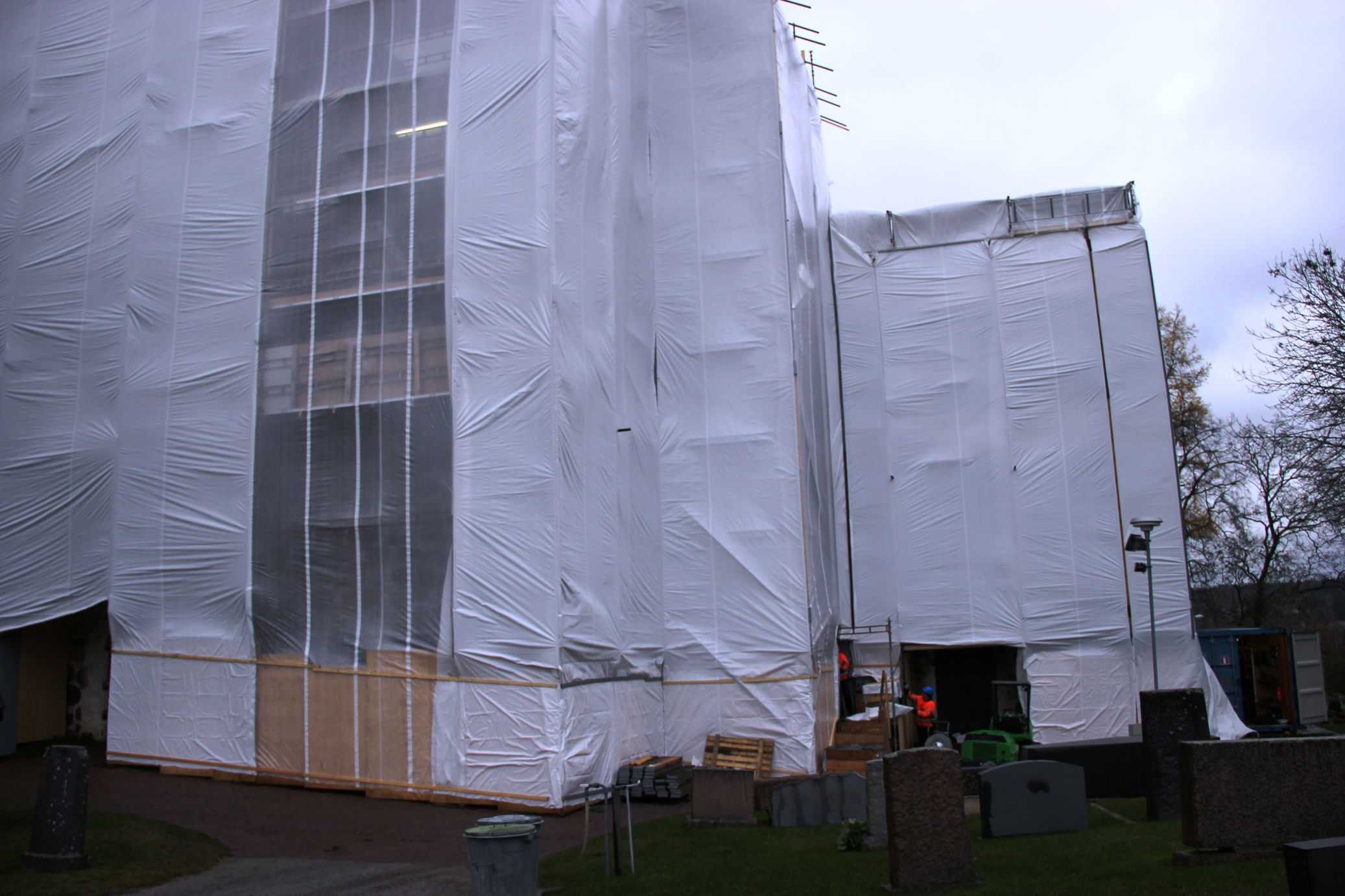
The church is wrapped 2014–2015 for renovation

Halikko Church was built in the mid-13th century. Most likely local manor owners the Horn family financed the construction. Therefore, Åminne manor had a right to patronage the priests of Halikko. Halikko Church was first a Roman Catholic church and its protector saint was Saint Bridget.

The Church needed to be expanded and mended in the late-18th century. The first expansion was made in 1799, and the second expansion was made between 1813 and 1815. During the second expansion the church was made cross-shaped. The old sacristy, weapon room and the grave of Horn-family had to be removed that the new parts could be built. At the same time, the whole church was renewed from the inside. An architect Charles Bassi designed the whole operation.

During the 20th century, Halikko Church has been mended three time: in 1921, 1954, and 1989–1990. The church has now sewers and electricity.

The Belfry of Halikko Church was built in 1773.

=== Legend ===
According to legend, Halikko Church was built c.a. 1440. Henrik Olafsson the Graf of Åminne manor financed the construction of the Halikko Church, the Pertteli Church and the Chapel of Salo to pay the sins of his family. His father-in-law had murdered his wife and the seen a vision in which Jesus said that he must pay his sins.

== Gallery ==
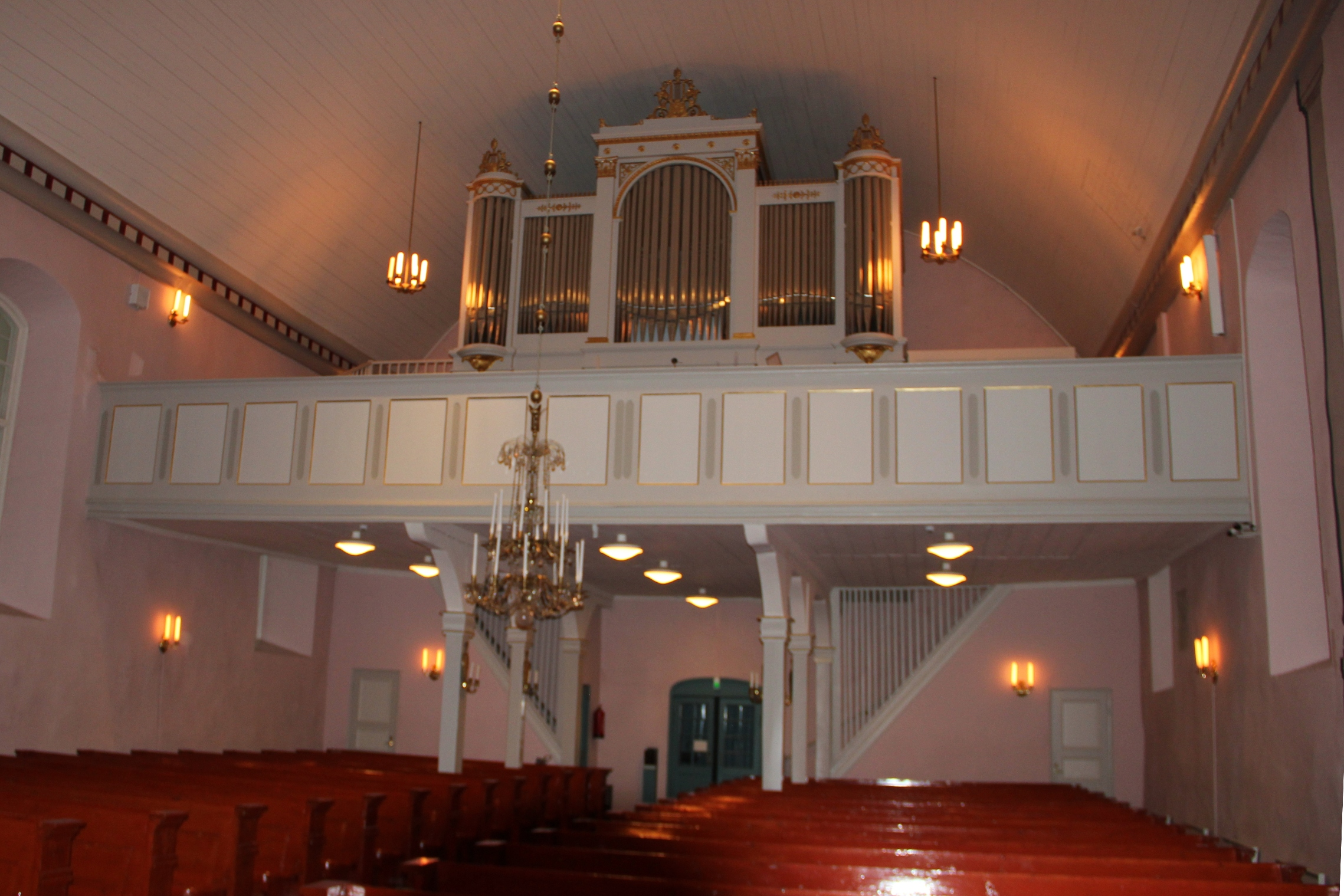
Organ

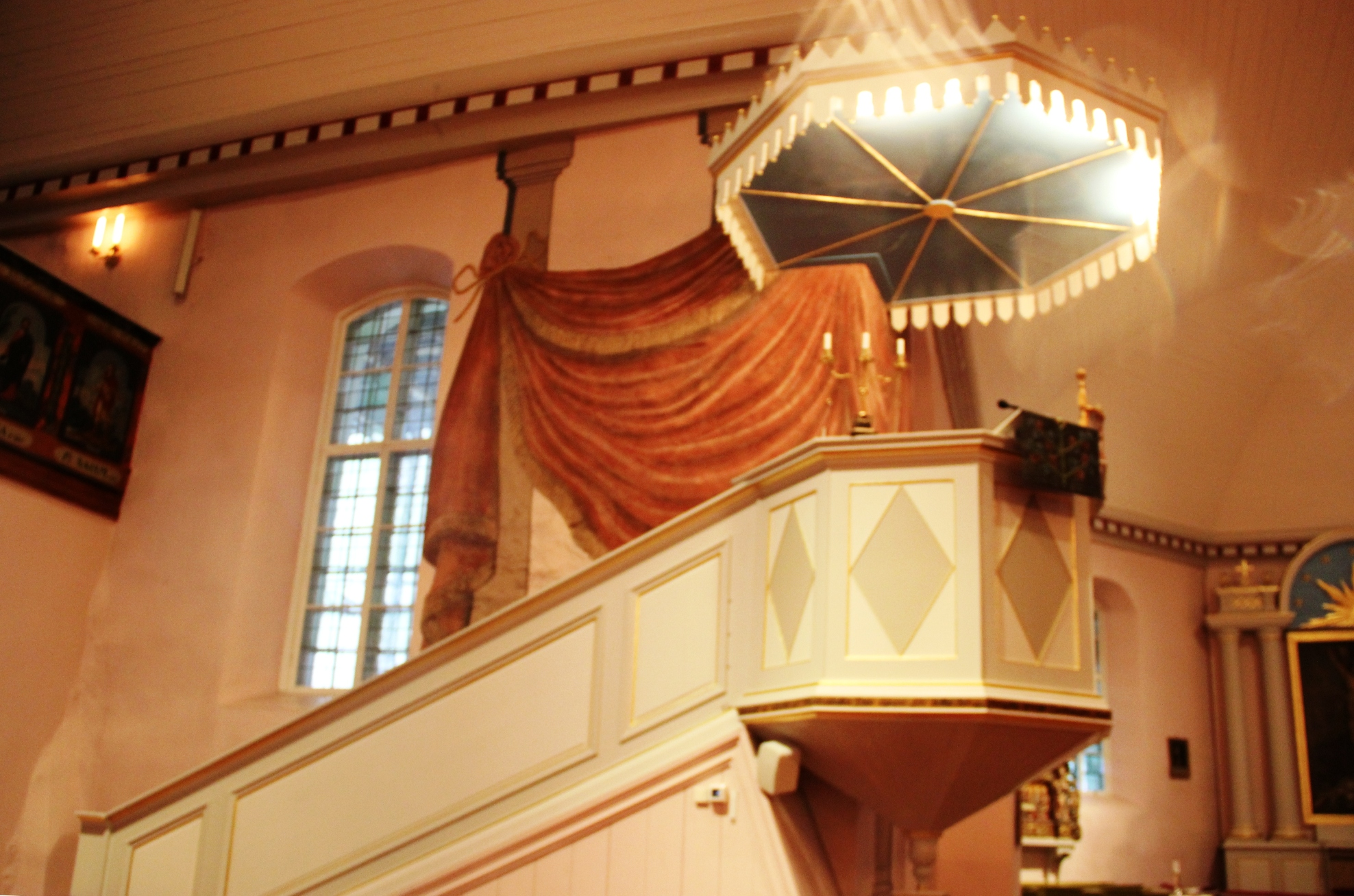
Pulpit

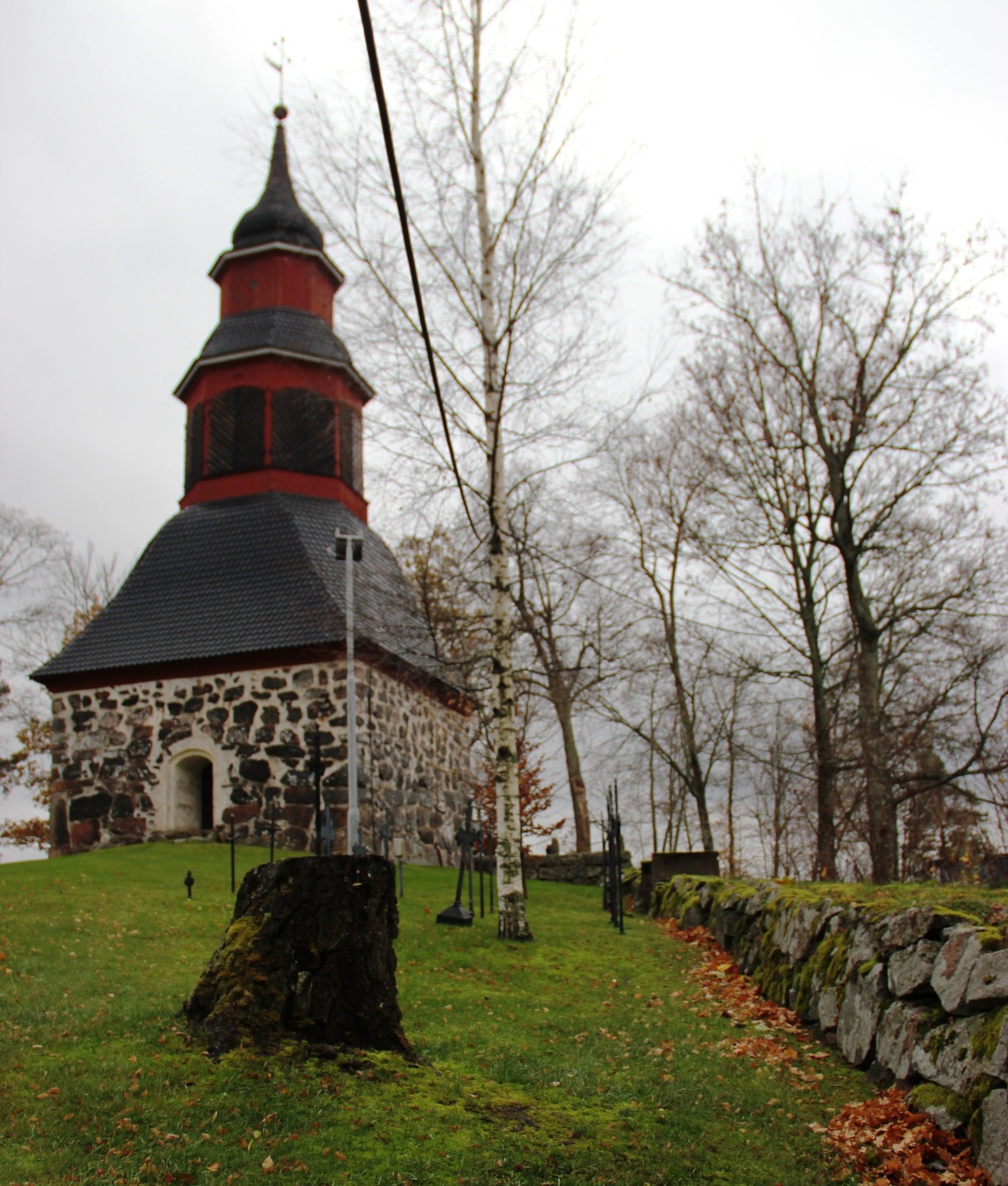
Bell tower

== Sources ==
- Guide's Book of Halikko Church
