= St. Catherine's Church, Turku =

St. Catherine's Church
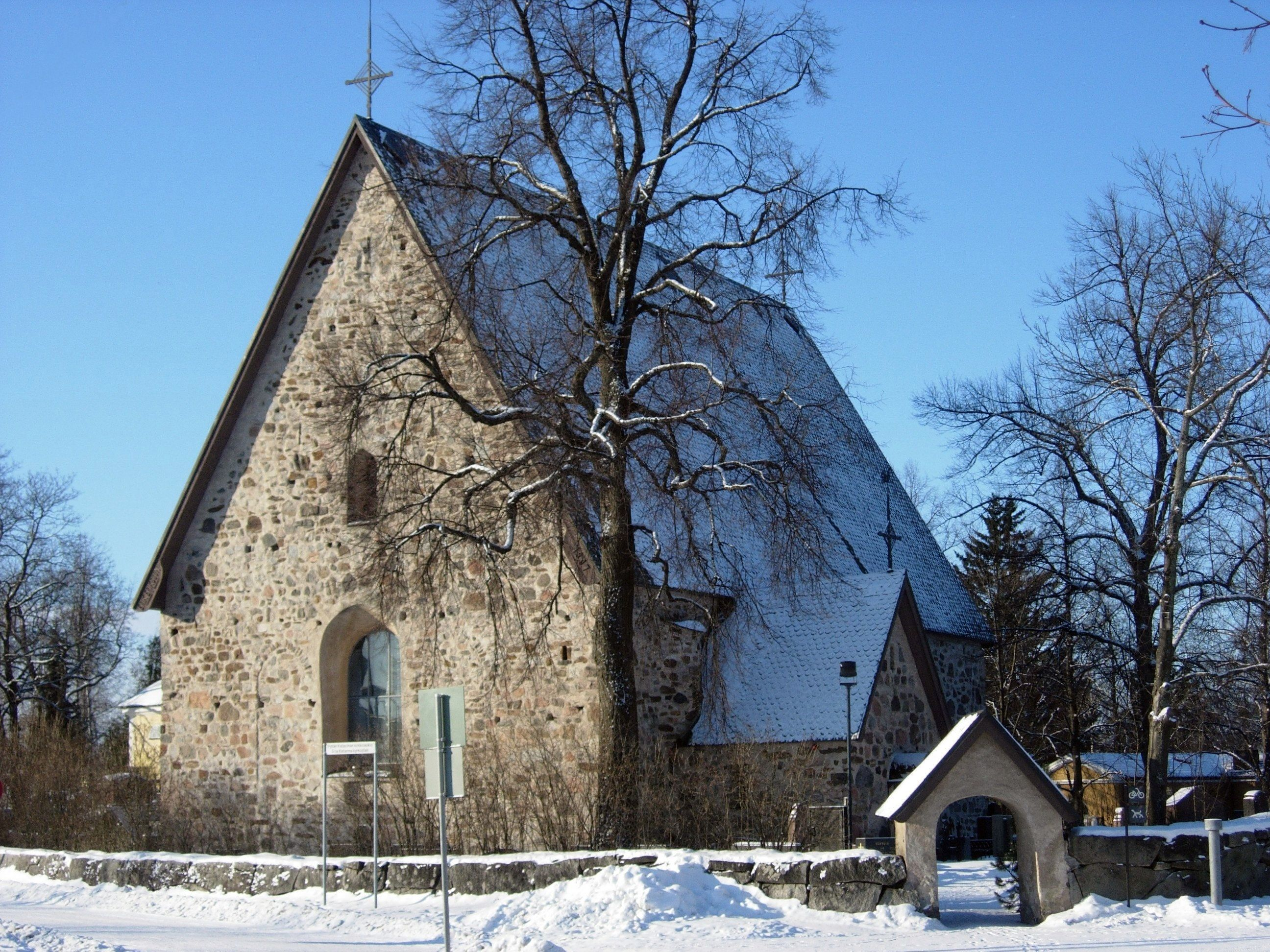
- St. Catherine's Church
- 60°27′44″N 22°17′37″E
- Location: Turku
- Country: Finland
- Denomination: Lutheran

History
- Status: Parish church
- Dedication: Catherine of Alexandria
- Consecrated: 22 January 1351

Architecture
- Functional status: Active
- Style: Gothic
- Years built: 1440s–1450s

Specifications
- Materials: Stone

Administration
- Archdiocese: Turku

St. Catherine's Church (Finnish: Pyhän Katariinan kirkko, Swedish: S:ta Katarina kyrka) is located in Nummi, a suburb of Turku, Finland, in the same district as Turku Student Village. It represents the old medieval stone church building tradition. Although it was completely destroyed and has undergone several renovations, it has preserved something of its original appearance and retains the basic plan of a medieval Finnish church. The construction was begun in the 1340s; the sacristy was completed first and the church later. Bishop Hemming and Bishop Thomas of Växjö consecrated the church on 22 January 1351.

The church was named after its patron saint Catherine of Alexandria in 1991. It used to be located in the region of Kaarina and was known was Kaarina Church. The first mention of Saint Catherine of Alexandria was in a signet with which vicar Jacob of Nummi confirmed the then episcopal election. Nummi, which surrounded the church, however, became a part of Turku in 1939. When Kaarina became its own parish, the church changed its name to St. Catherine's Church.
