= Lammi Church =

Church in Hämeenlinna, Finland

Coordinates: 61°04′49″N 025°00′48″E

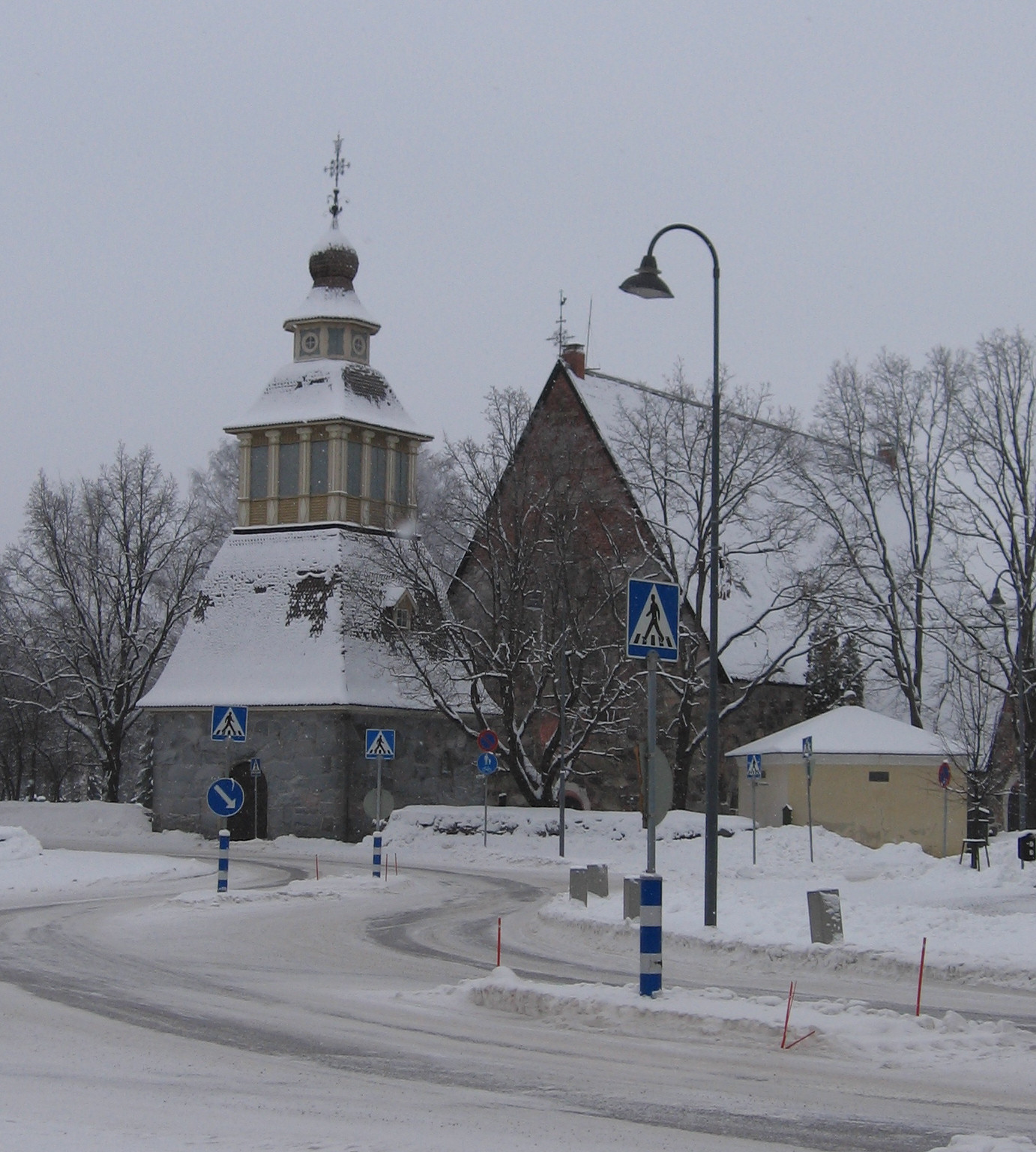
Lammi Church in February 2007.

Lammi Church (Finnish: Lammin kirkko, Swedish: Lampis kyrka) is a medieval stone church located in Lammi, Hämeenlinna, Southern Finland. It was built during the 1510s.
