= Leo Leppä =

Finnish politician (1893–1958)

Leo Lauri Leppä (28 May 1893 in Lammi – 18 August 1958) was a Finnish Lutheran clergyman and politician. He was a member of the Parliament of Finland from 1945 to 1948, representing the National Coalition Party.
