= Pedersöre Church =

- Pedersöre kyrka (Swedish); Pedersören kirkko (Finnish)
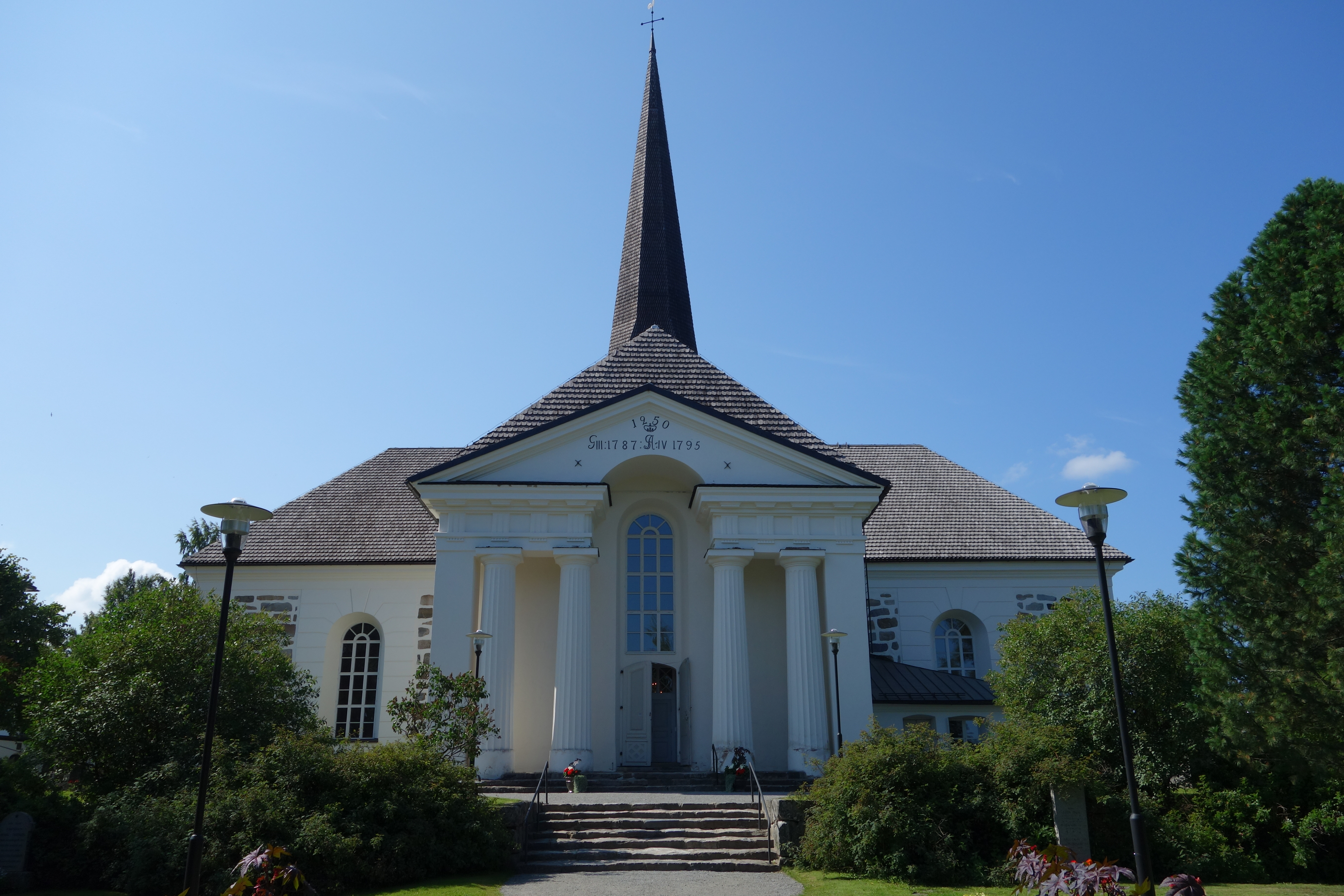
- The front of Pedersöre Church
- Pedersöre Church
- 63°39′51″N 022°42′02″E
- Location: Pedersöre
- Country: Finland
- Denomination: Evangelical Lutheran Church of Finland

History
- Consecrated: first constructed in the 13th century, built to its final form in around 1510-1520, and remodeled in 1787

Architecture
- Years built: 13th century, rebuilt around 1510-1520

Specifications
- Materials: originally wood, but currently graystone

Administration
- Diocese: Diocese of Borgå

Pedersöre Church (Swedish: Pedersöre kyrka, Finnish: Pedersören kirkko) is a medieval stone church in Jakobstad (Finnish: Pietarsaari). It is one of the oldest medieval churches in Ostrobothnia. The site of the first wooden church was built in the late 1200s. The church was re-built from its medieval design, and it was re-designed into a cross-church at the end of 1700s.

== History ==
The first church stood on the site was probably a small chapel built in stone or wood. The oldest parts of the present church originate from the 1400s. The original medieval stone church had the shape of a rectangular nave with the altar in the east and a tower in the west.

In 1787 work began on the renovation to become an equal-arm cross-church. The work would be performed by the 33-year-old Jacob Rijfs after drawings approved by King Gustav III. The drawings were followed, but not exactly down to the word, thus, the 65m high spire was preserved. The model for this steeple is believed to have been the Storkyrkan tower in Stockholm from the 1490s. In July 1985, the spire was destroyed in a fire that also destroyed the former altarpiece and organ.

After the fire, the church was completely renovated after the architect Erik Crow's drawings and was restored in 1986. A new 39-note organ was installed in 1988. It was made by the Danish organ building company Marcussen & Søn, and became the fifth church organ.

=== The Bell Tower ===
The bell tower is built with a ground floor made of stone in a typical Ostrobothnian style. The upper part is built of wood. The bell tower was built under the supervision of Thomas Rijf and Matt Honga during the years of 1769-1775.

One of the belfry's bells are from 1488 and was probably manufactured in Tallinn. In 1615, Jacob De la Gardie bought the clock from its original place in Turku Cathedral and donated it to the church of Pedersöre.

== Gallery ==
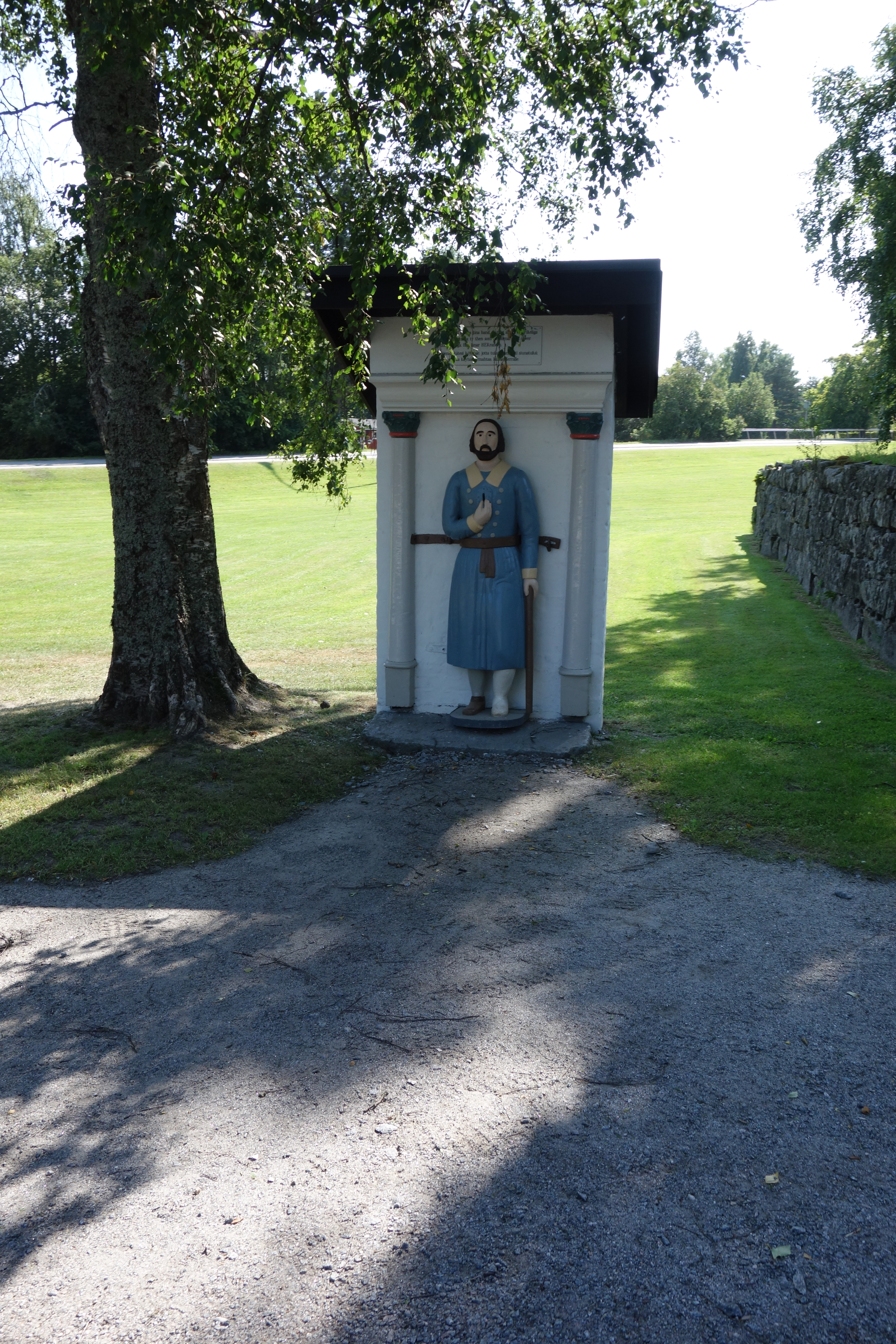
The Poor Man Statue outside of Pedersöre Church

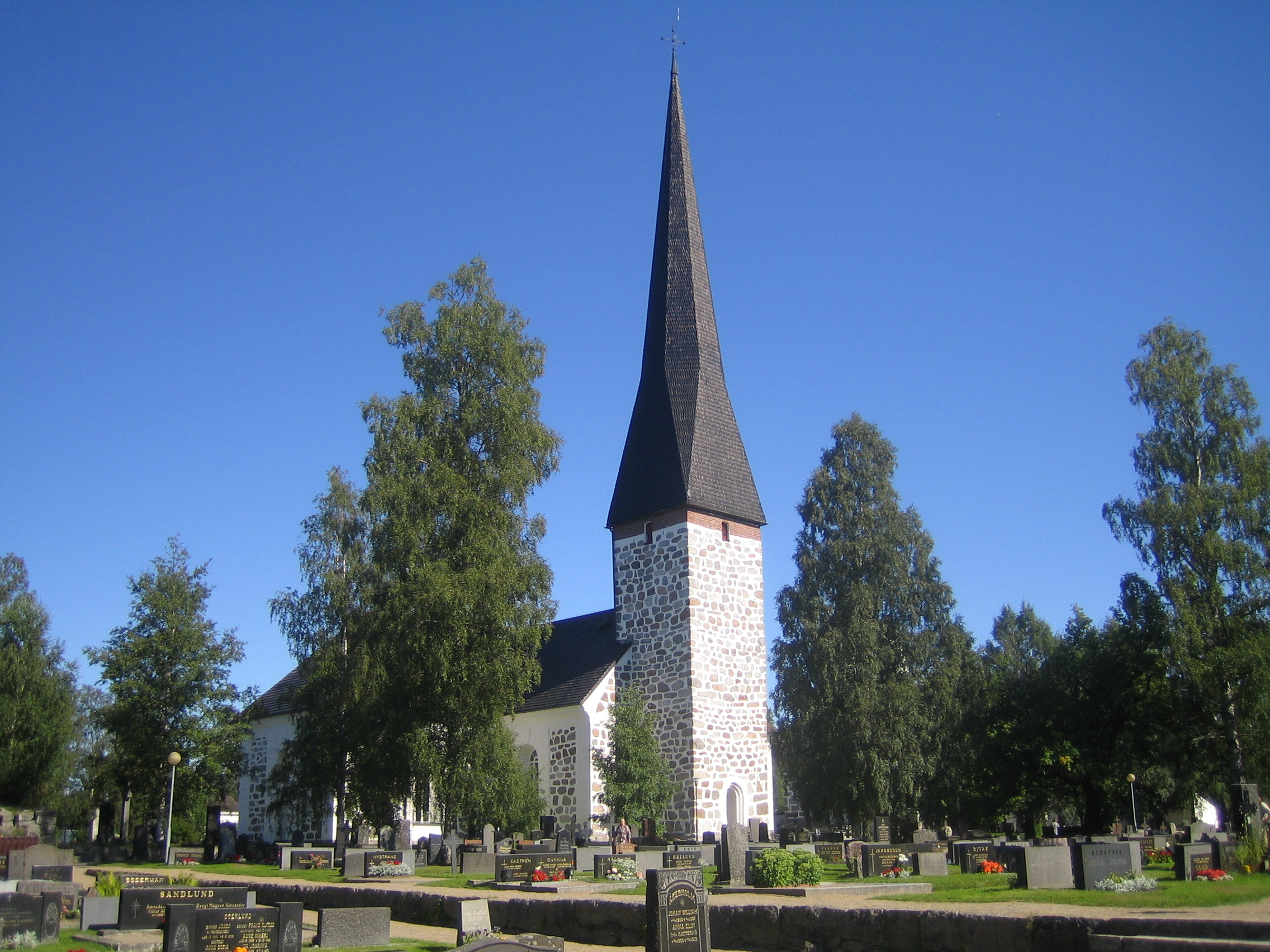
Pedersöre Church in Jakobstad, Finland

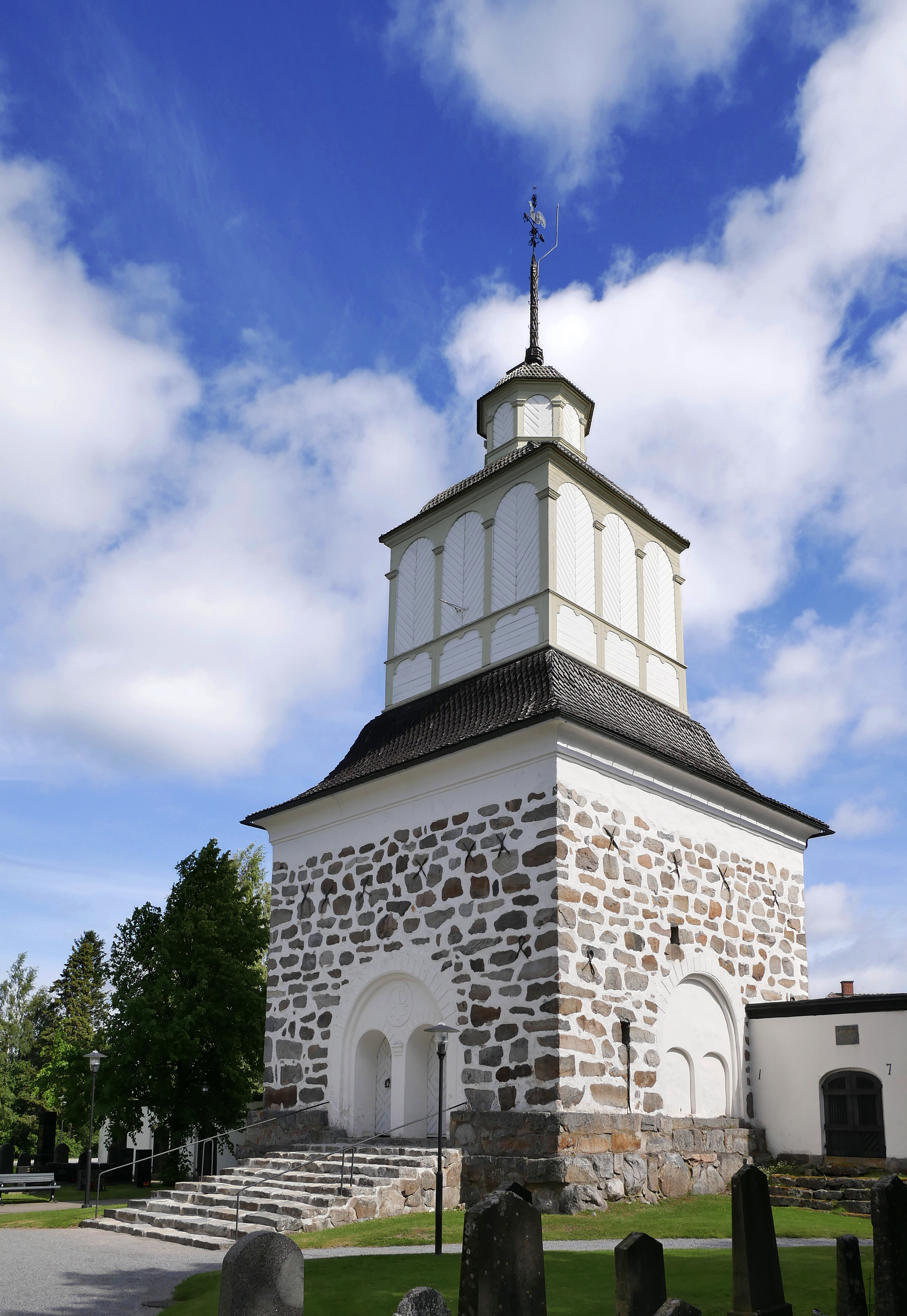
The bell tower at the church

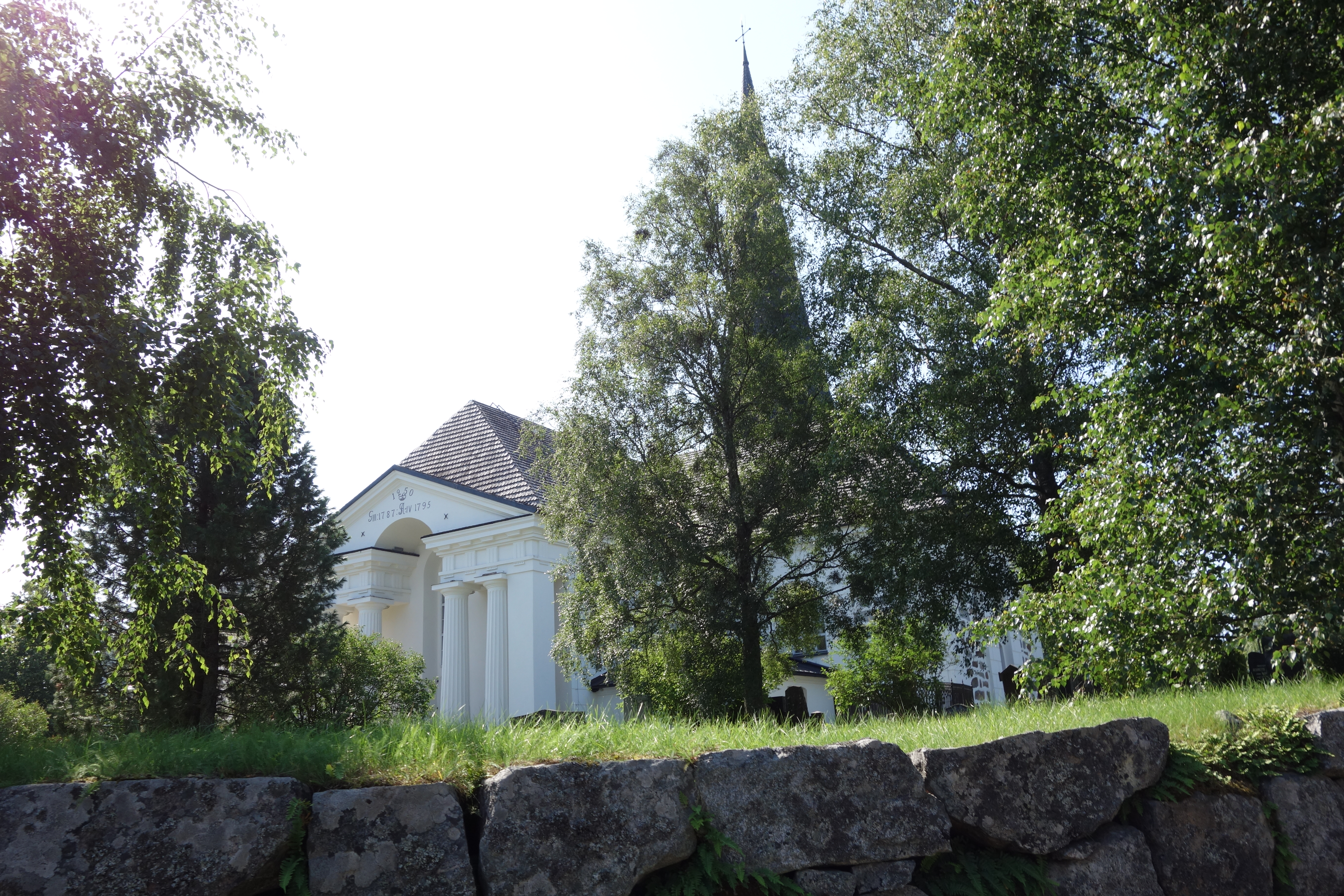
A partial view of the front of the church

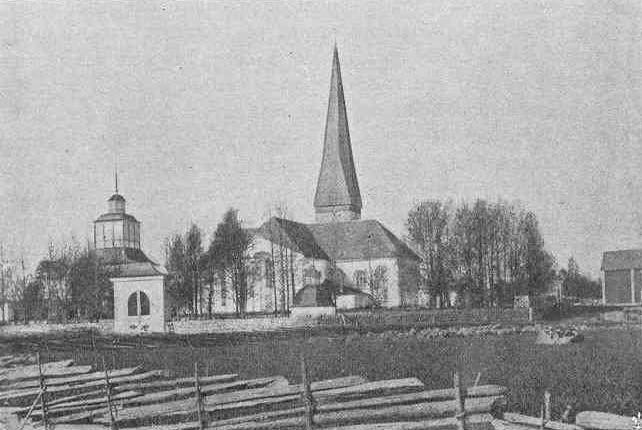
From the work "Finland in words and pictures" of O.M. Reuter, printed in Stockholm 1901, page 844

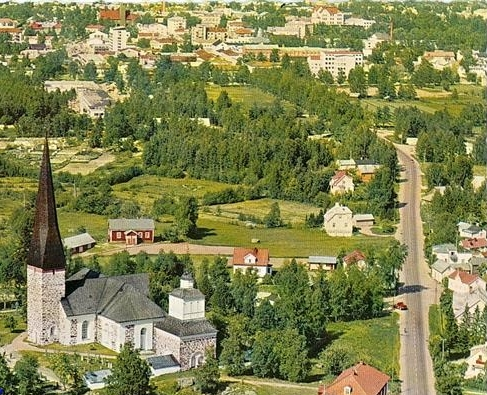
A picture of Pedersöre Church taken before 1965

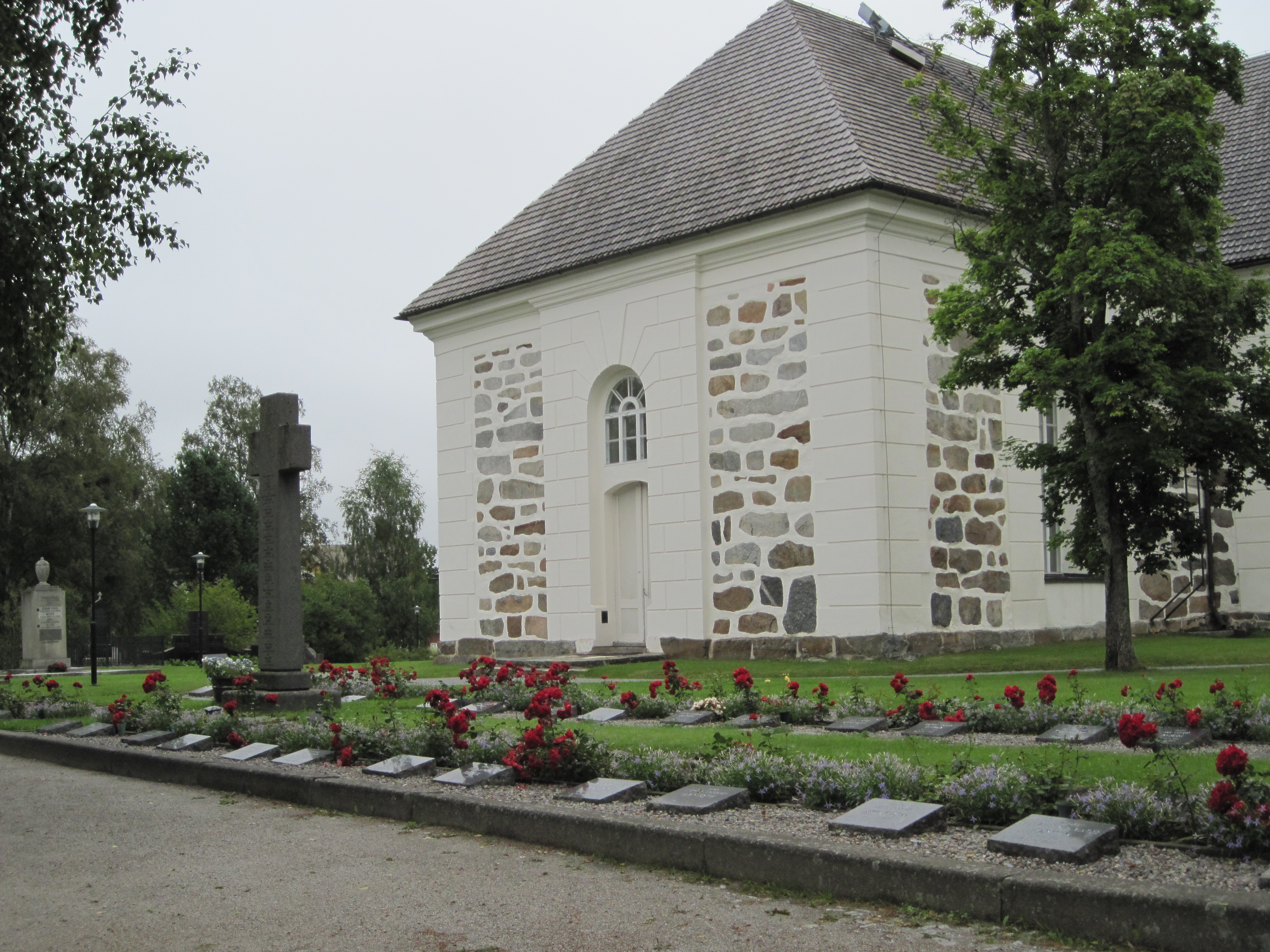
Military cemetery at Pedersöre church in Jakobstad, Finland
