= St. Olaf's Church, Jomala =

Church building in Jomala, Åland, Finland

Coordinates: 60°09′18″N 19°56′54″E

Jomala Church, Church of St. Olaf Jomala kyrka, Sankt Olav kyrka (in Swedish)
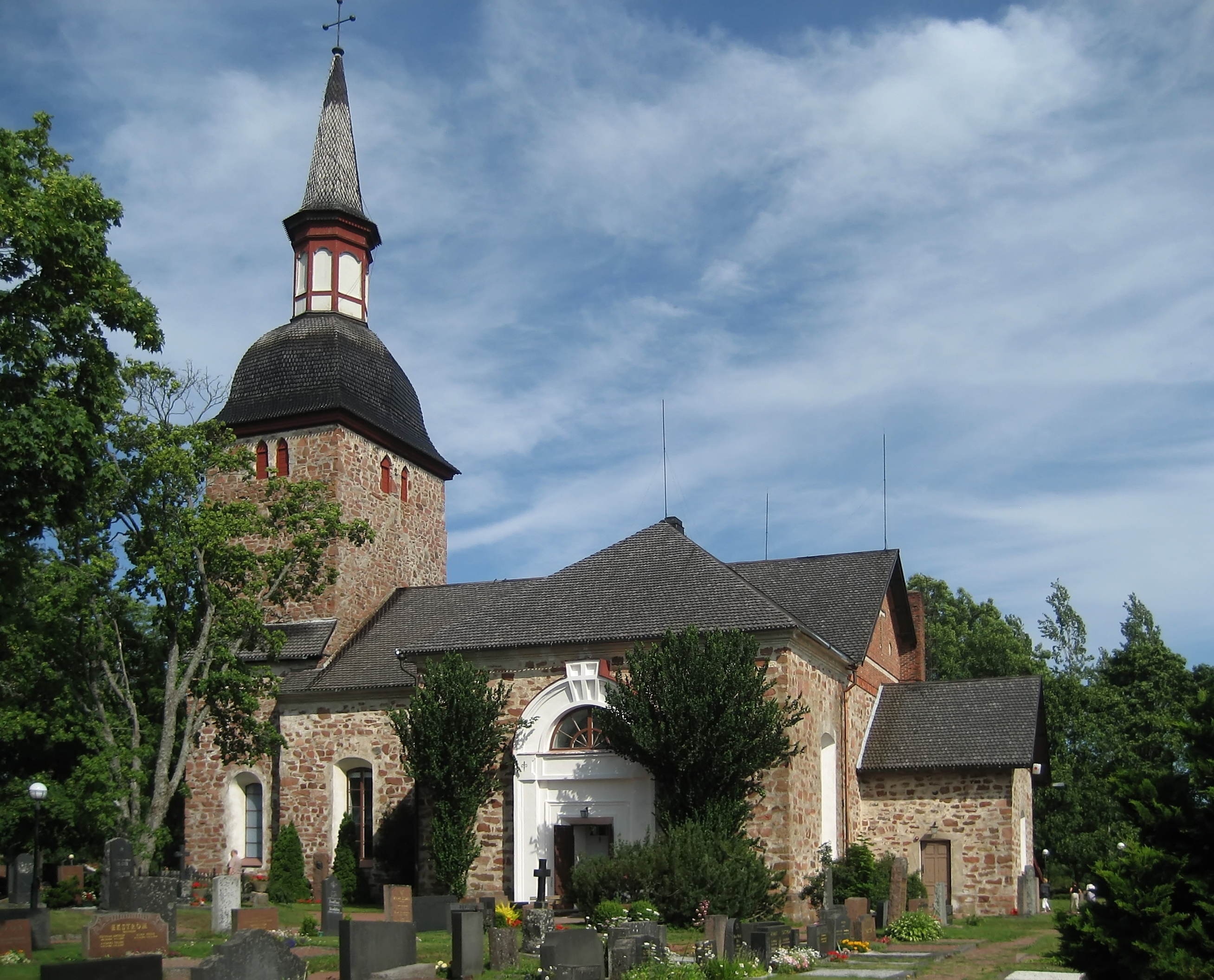
- Church of St. Olaf

Religion
- Affiliation: Evangelical Lutheran Church of Finland

Location
- Location: Jomala, Åland, Finland
- Interactive map of Jomala Church, Church of St. Olaf; Jomala kyrka, Sankt Olav kyrka (in Swedish)

Architecture
- Style: Medieval stone
- Completed: c. 1280

Specifications
- Spire: 1
- Materials: red granite, limestone

The Church of St. Olaf is a medieval stone church in Jomala, Åland. It belongs to the Evangelical Lutheran Church of Finland. Dating from about 1260 to 1280, it is possibly the oldest Christian church in Finland, and was extended in the 19th century. It is constructed of local red granite and limestone. The church is dedicated to King Olaf II of Norway, patron saint of the Åland Islands and Jomala.

Pope Alexander III confirmed Olaf's local canonization in 1164, making him a universally recognised saint of the Roman Catholic Church. The coloured wall paintings from the 1280s on the Western gable represent scenes from the parable of the Prodigal Son. Considerations to expand the church began in the 17th century and a plan from 1808, while under Swedish rule, was not acted on. From 1844, under the Russian Empire, the extensions were made. In 1968, a new stained-glass window was donated to the church by the American artist Ture Bengtz, whose ancestors were from Jomala.

== See also ==
- Medieval stone churches in Finland
