= St. Mary's Church, Turku =

Medieval stone church in Turku, Finland

St. Mary's Church
- Maarian kirkko S:t Marie kyrka
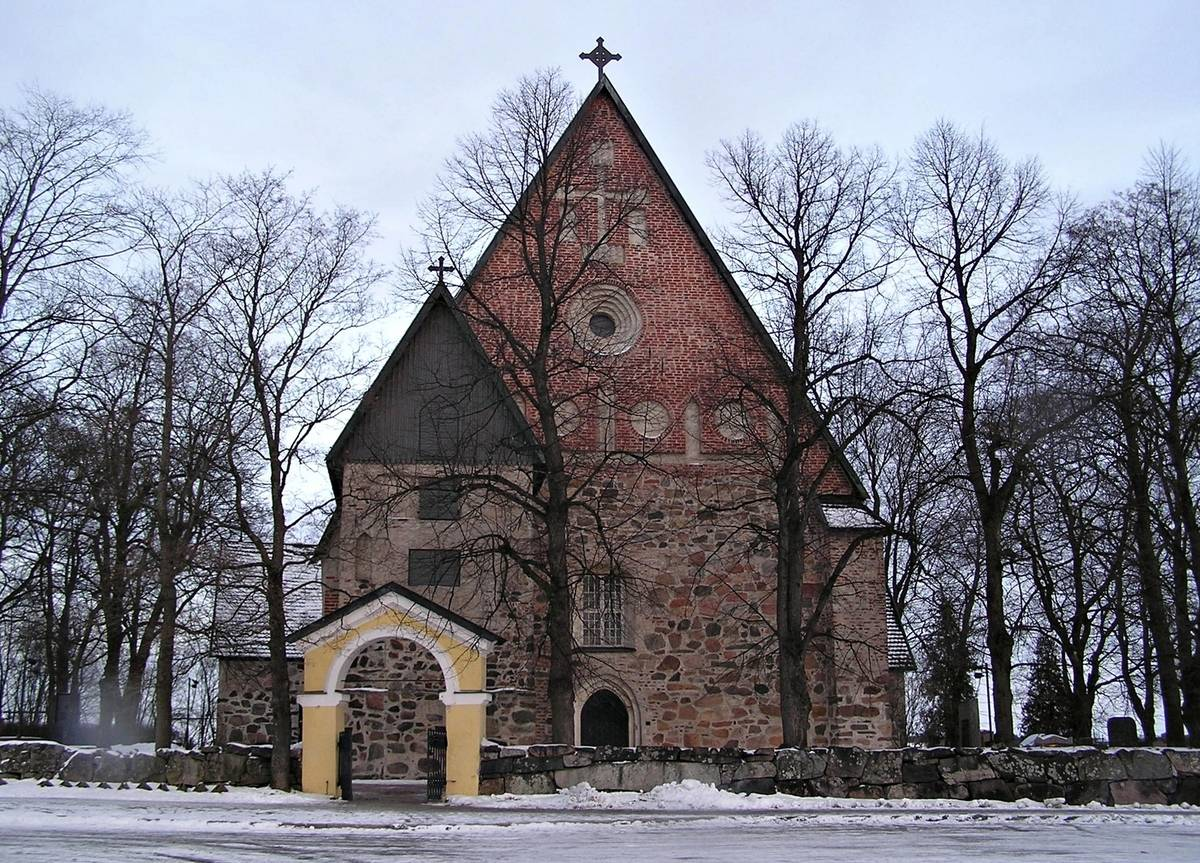
- St. Mary's Church
- 60°28′24″N 022°17′36″E
- Location: Turku
- Country: Finland
- Denomination: Evangelical Lutheran

History
- Status: Completed

Architecture
- Architectural type: Medieval
- Completed: Ca. 1440s

St. Mary's Church (Finnish: Maarian kirkko, Swedish: S:t Marie kyrka) is a medieval stone church located in Maaria, in Turku, Finland. There are no records as to when the present church was built, but the work was probably started in the mid or late 15th century. According to Markus Hiekkanen, the church was probably built in the 1440s, on the basis of the style of the closets; the gables were constructed about 50 years later. There are medieval limestone paintings on the walls, which are not common to other places in Finland. The most valuable artefacts are the wooden altar cabinet and a large altarpiece depicting Christ on the cross.
