= Lammi =

Former municipality of Finland

Coordinates: 61°04′45″N 25°00′40″E

Coat of arms

Location of Lammi in Finland

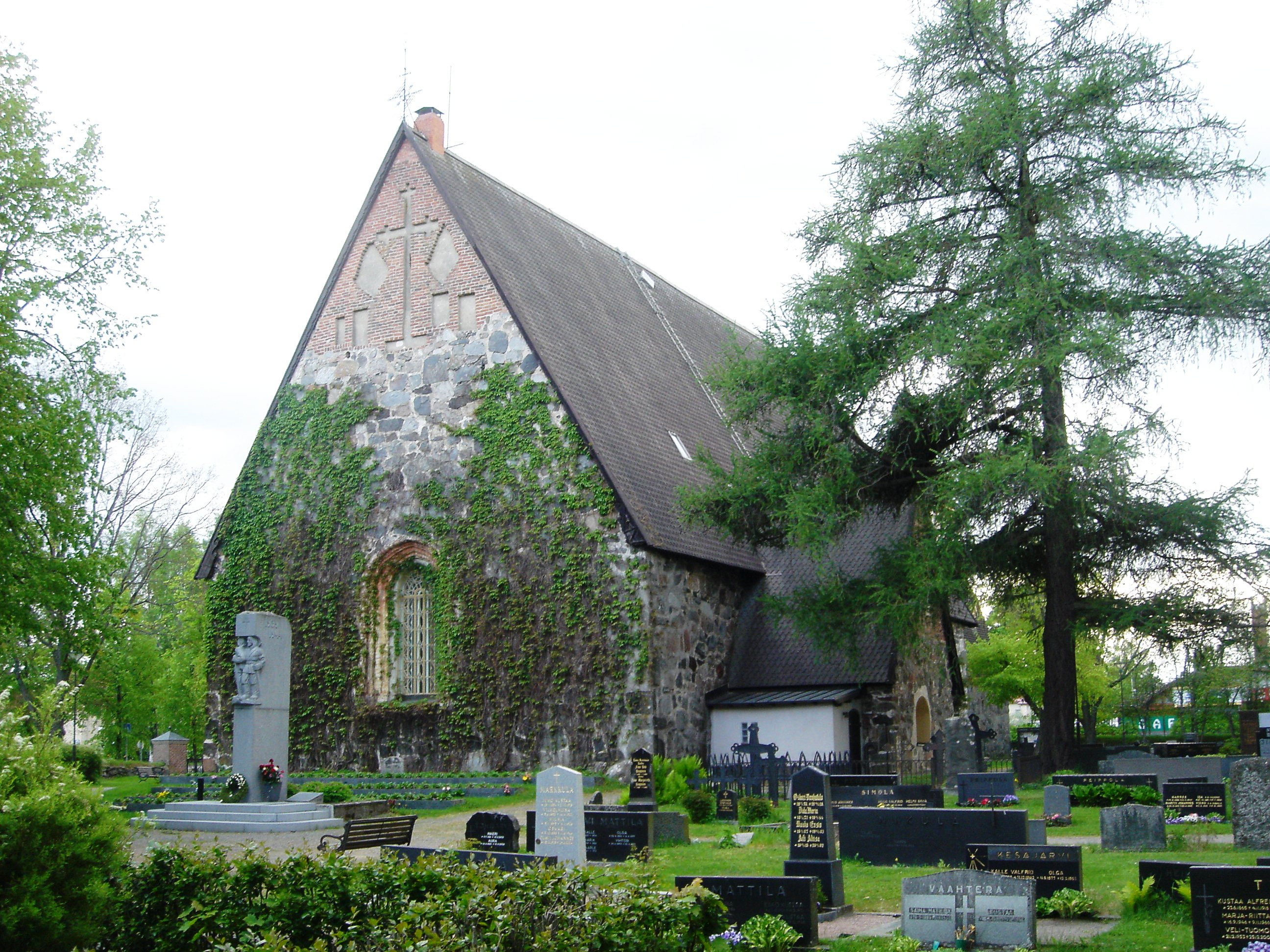
Lammi Church was built between 1490 and 1510 and was dedicated to St. Catherine of Alexandria.

Lammi (Swedish: Lammi, also Lampis) is a former municipality of Finland. It was consolidated with Hämeenlinna on 2009-01-01.

It is located in the province of Southern Finland and is part of the Kanta-Häme region. The municipality had a population of 5,507 (2008) and covered an area of 611.24 km², of which 73.69 km² is water. The population density is 11 inhabitants per km².

Neighbouring municipalities were Asikkala, Hauho, Hausjärvi, Hämeenkoski, Janakkala, Kärkölä, Luopioinen, Padasjoki and Tuulos.

The municipality was unilingually Finnish.

The lake Kuohijärvi is located in Lammi and the lake Pääjärvi is situated at the border between Lammi and Hämeenkoski.

== Notable people ==
- Leo Leppä
- Matti Rantanen

== See also ==
- Evo, Hämeenlinna
