= Sauvo Church =

Medieval Finnish church

Coordinates: 60.3425°N 22.6989°E

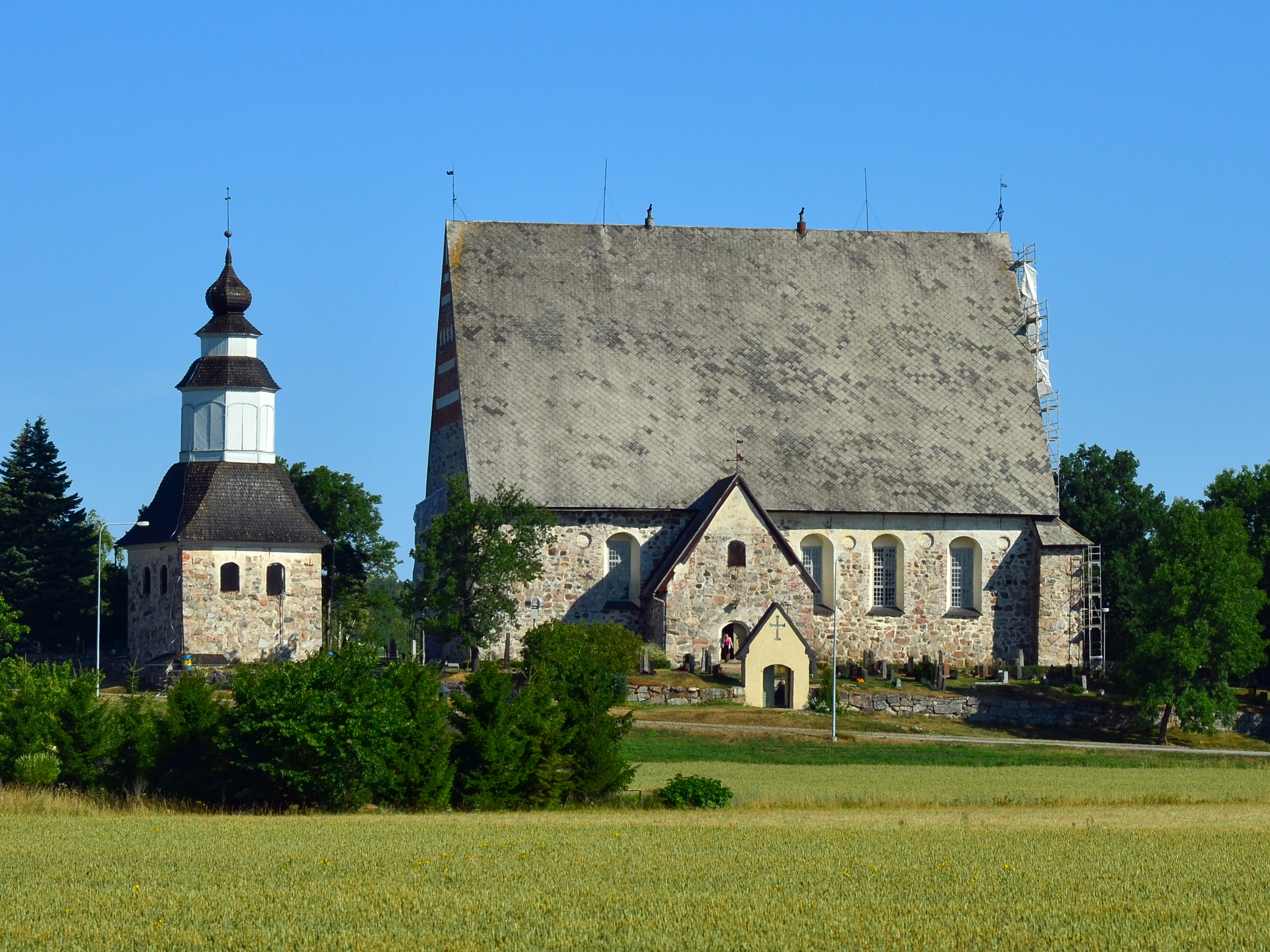
The Sauvo Church

Constructed between the years of 1460 and 1472, the Sauvo church (Finnish: Sauvon kirkko, Swedish: Sagu kyrka) is a medieval stone church located within Sauvo, Finland. A military cemetery exists at the church.

== History ==
The Sauvo Church was built between the years of 1460 and 1472, although the first historical mention of this church dates back to the year of 1346 from the Turku Cathedral as there have been several wooden churches on this site at the beginning of the 13th century.

Many renovations to the church were made during the 17th century, but the interior of the church is very well-preserved. The mural paintings within said church are from the 15th century and there are several medieval artifacts such as the altar, a triumph crucifix and a tabernacle.

== Gallery ==
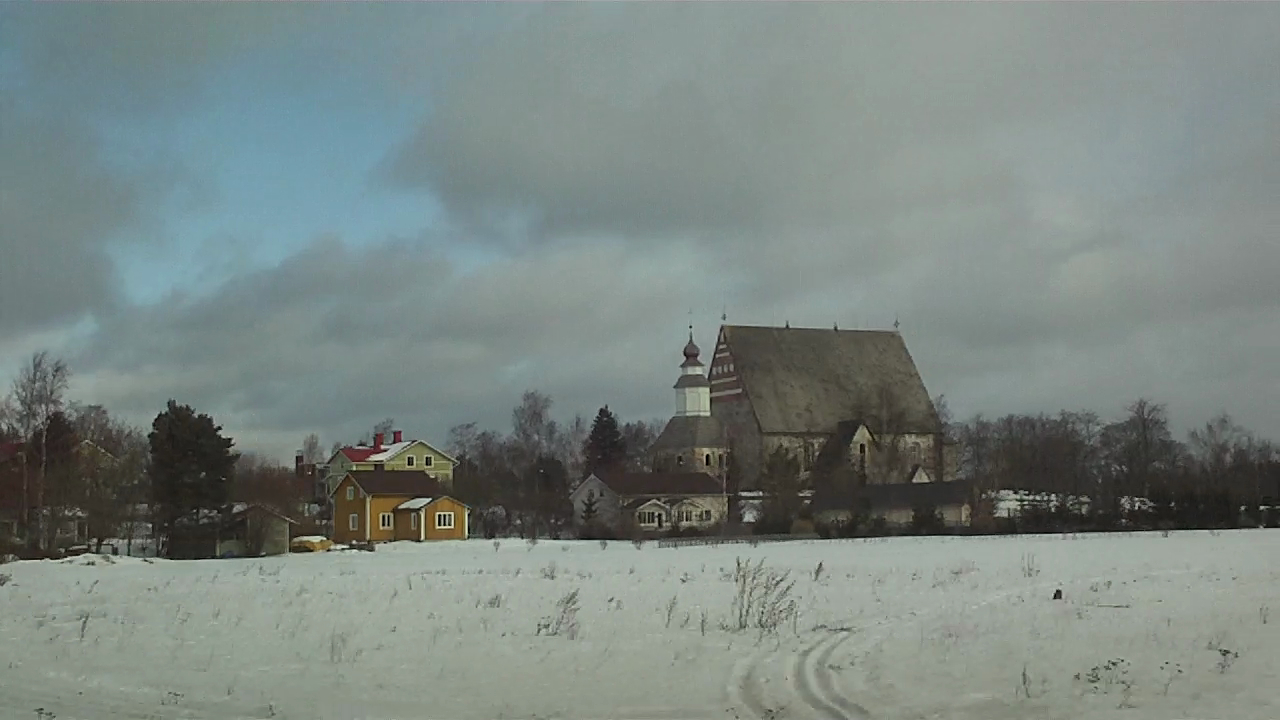

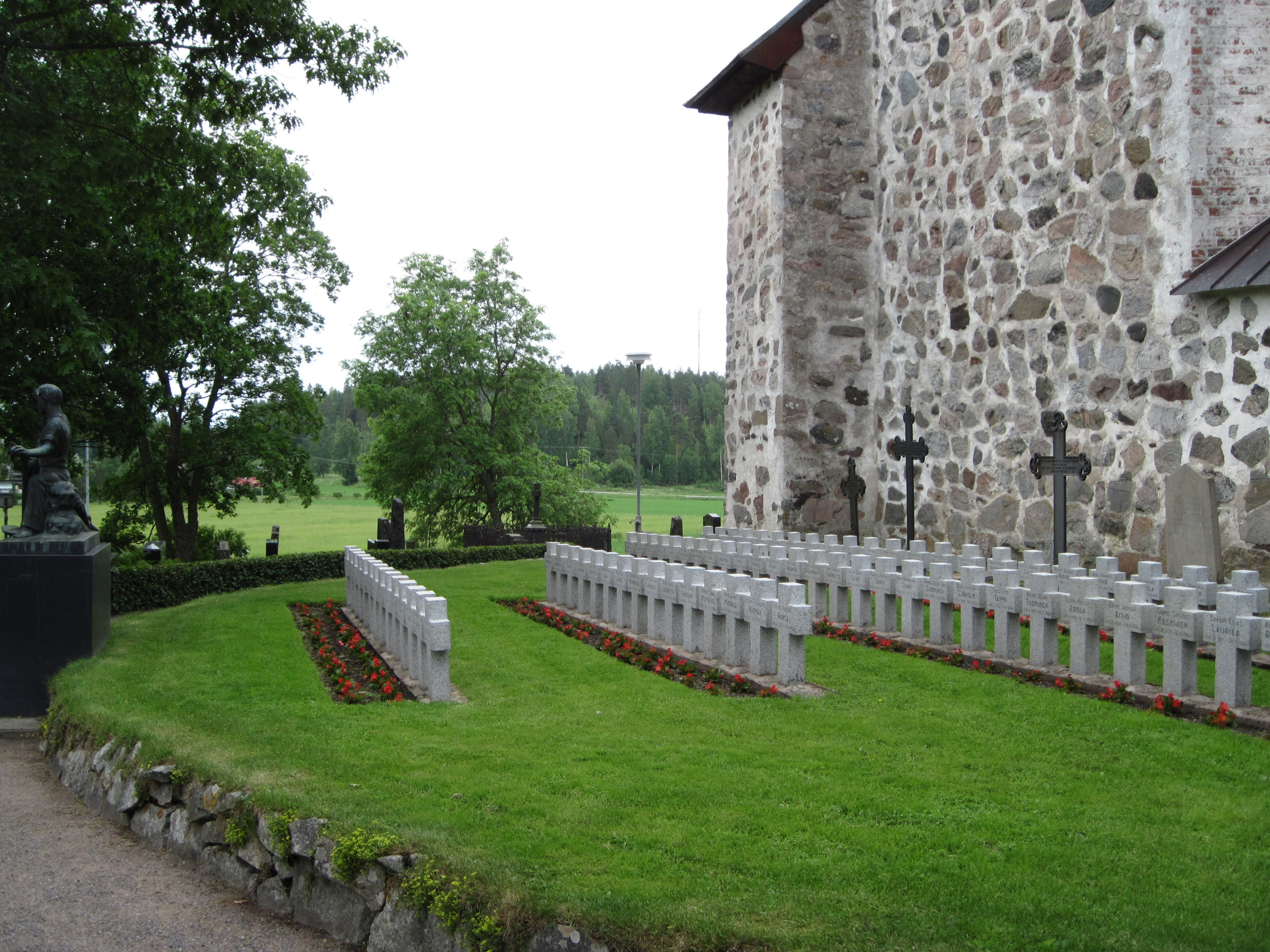
The military cemetery at the Sauvo Church in 2011.

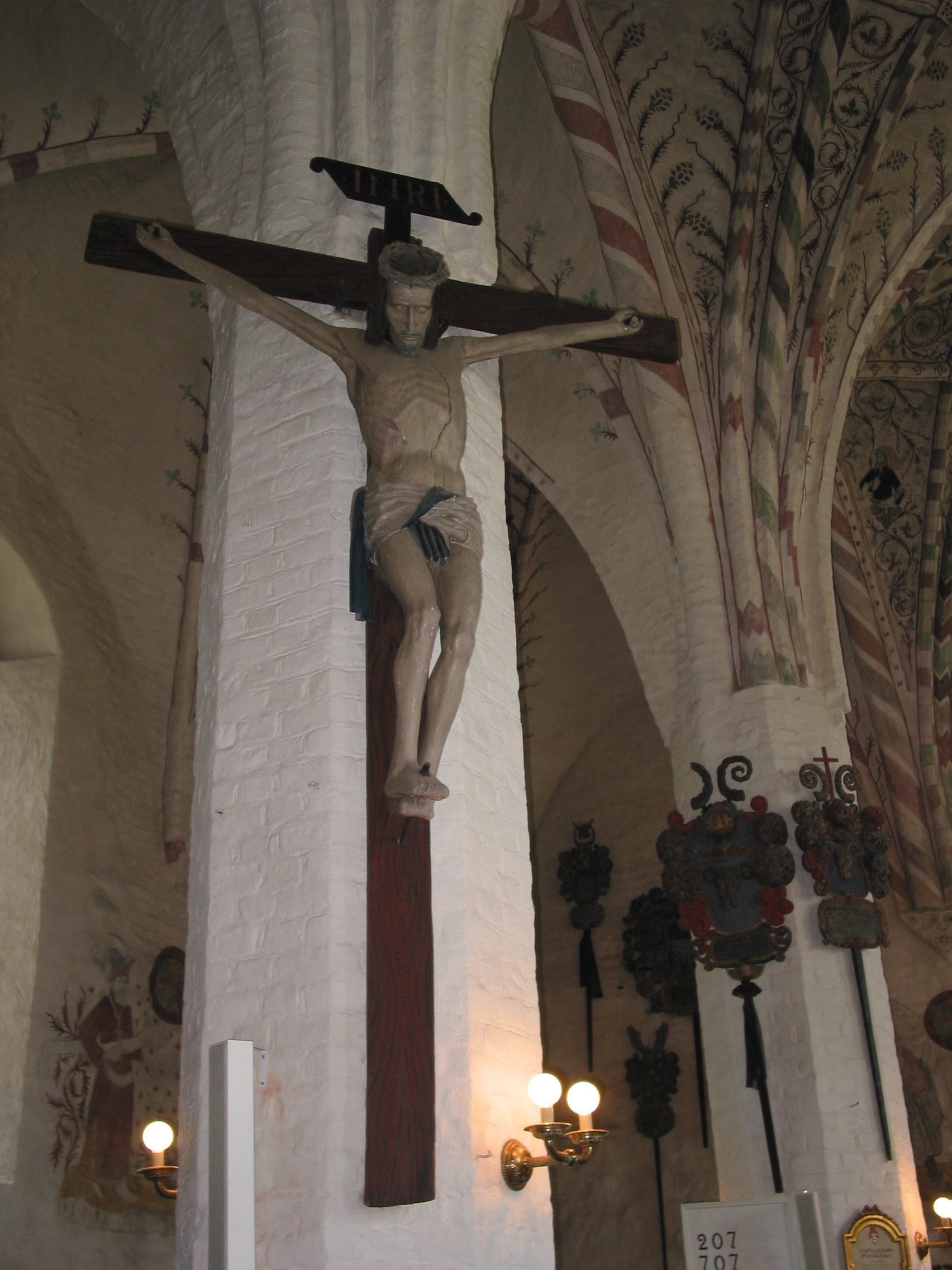
The 15th-century crucifix inside the Sauvo Church.

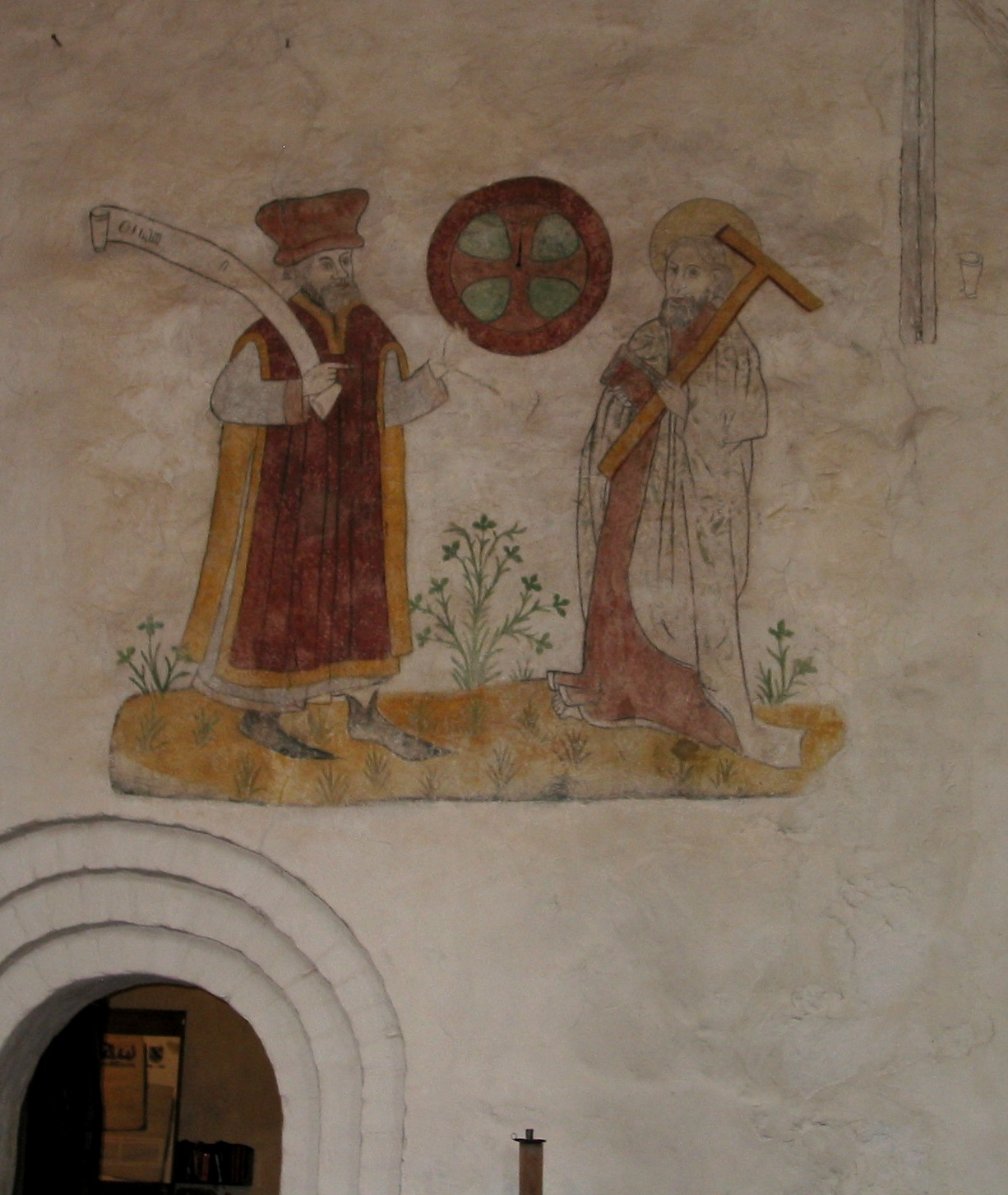
A mural within the Sauvo Church
