= Medieval stone churches in Finland =

Finnish churches

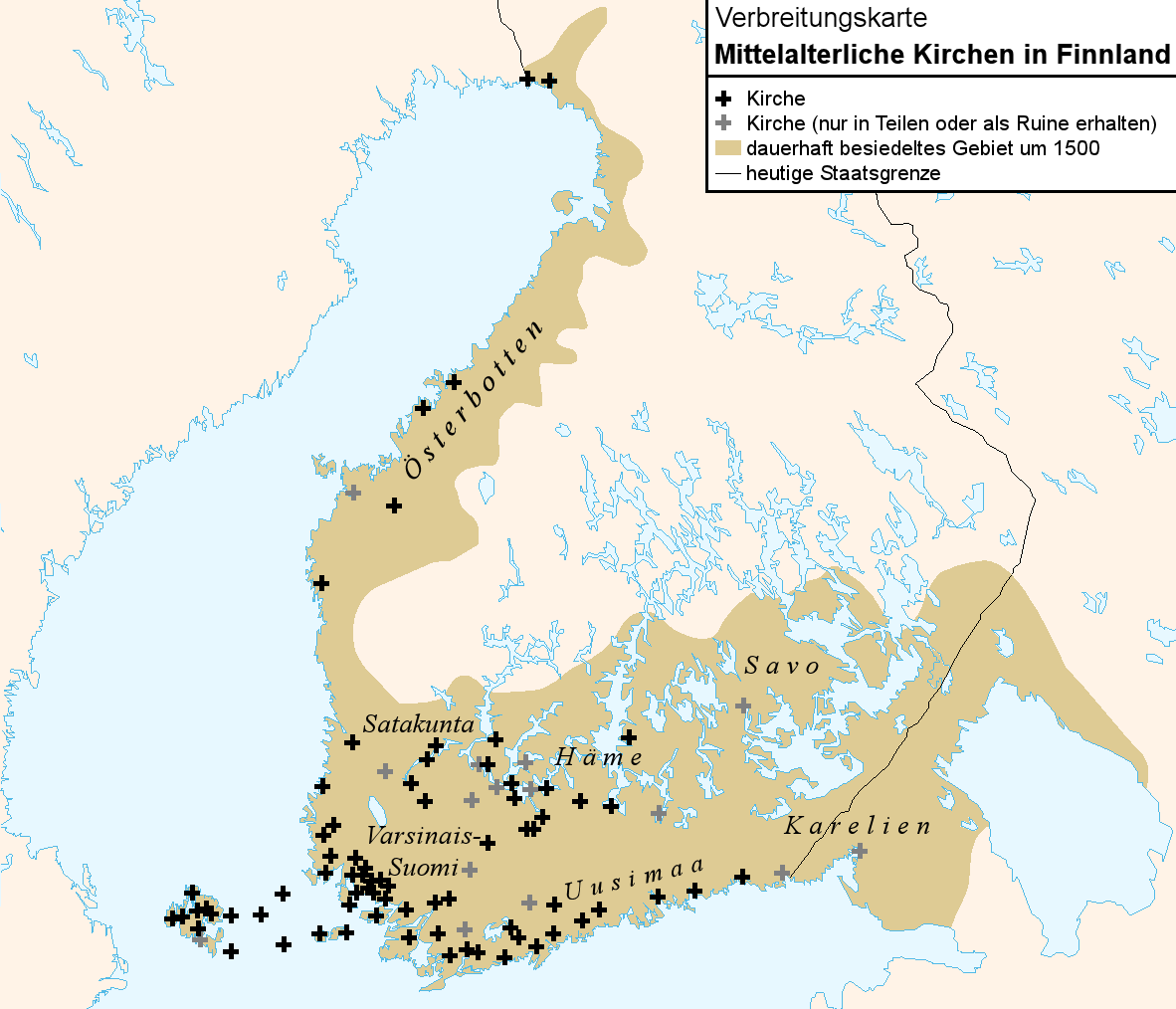
Medieval stone churches in Finland. Brown color indicating the populated area in 1500 AD.

Medieval stone churches in Finland were built between the 13th and 16th century. The total number of churches was 104, of which 83 have been preserved. Numbers include the sacristies of uncompleted churches. Finnish medieval stone churches are mainly located in the western and southern parts of the country. They were usually fieldstone churches made of grey granite. Some are built of red granite and limestone while two churches are made of brick.

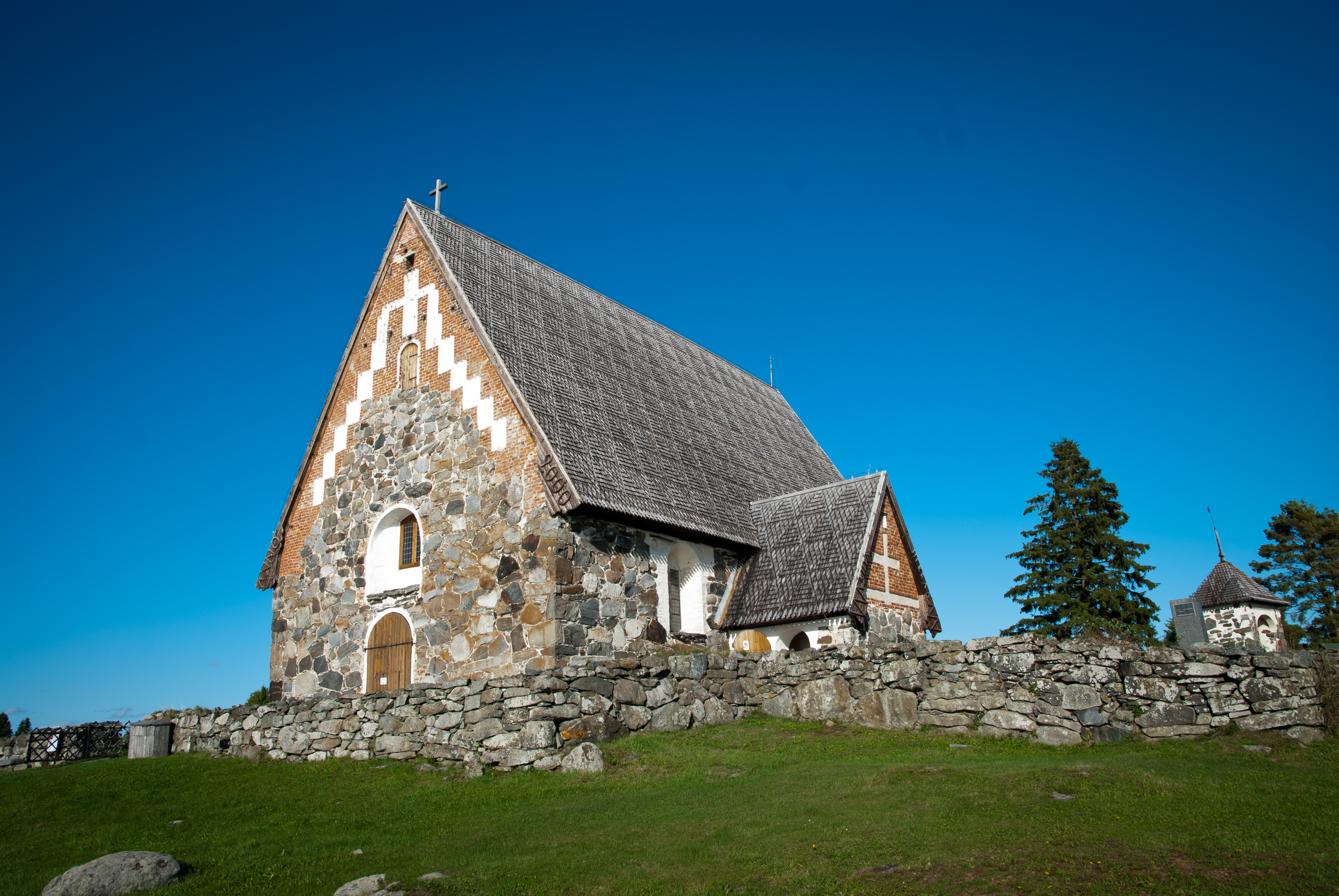
St. Olaf's Church, Tyrvää.

== History ==
Christianity gained a foothold in Finland during the 11th century. The oldest churches and chapels were built of wood, which remained the most common material until the late 19th century. The oldest preserved wooden churches in Finland date back to the 17th century. The oldest stone church is the St. Olaf's Church in Jomala, Åland. It was completed 1260–1280.

Dating the churches is difficult, since there are very few reliable sources. During the era of Finnish nationalism in the late 19th century, the stone churches were considered to be from the 12th or 13th century. They were later mainly dated back to the 14th century. In the 1990s, the Finnish archeologist Markus Hiekkanen claimed the churches were much younger, constructed between the 15th and early 16th century.

== Style ==
Finnish medieval stone churches can be classified in three groups by their architectural style. The first group includes the oldest churches found exclusively in the Åland Islands. The second group is mainly built in the areas of Southwest Finland, Uusimaa and the southern parts of Tavastia. The youngest group is located in the historical provinces of Satakunta and Ostrobothnia. In this period, new churches were also completed in regions where they already existed. The last medieval stone churches were built in the 1550s.

Finnish stone churches are small and simple, more like village churches. The exception is Turku Cathedral which is the national shrine of Finland. Most churches do not have a steeple, but a wooden bell tower located next to them. The churches are usually considered as representative of European Gothic. Brick ornaments on the gables are influenced by Brick Gothic in Northern Germany from where many of the builders came. Only the oldest churches in Åland have Romanesque forms. Since brick was expensive, it was used only for window and door frames, vaults and gable ornaments. The only medieval brick churches in Finland are Turku Cathedral in Turku and Holy Cross Church in Hattula.

== Interiors ==
The inside walls and vaults were usually painted white and decorated with Fresco-secco mural paintings. They are the oldest examples of Finnish art. The paintings of 47 churches have been preserved. This artwork was often painted over during the Reformation era, but later uncovered. Some churches have notable paintings by foreign masters, but others display a rather primitive form of art. Only a few stained glass windows are preserved.

Finnish stone churches have some 800 wooden sculptures, including 130 crucifixes. They were mainly imported from Gotland or Northern Germany, but some are the work of local Finnish masters. The pews were made of wood, as were the pulpits. During the winter, the churches were usually very cold since there was no heating. Some of the churches had burial vaults for the local nobility and other devout persons.

== Gallery ==
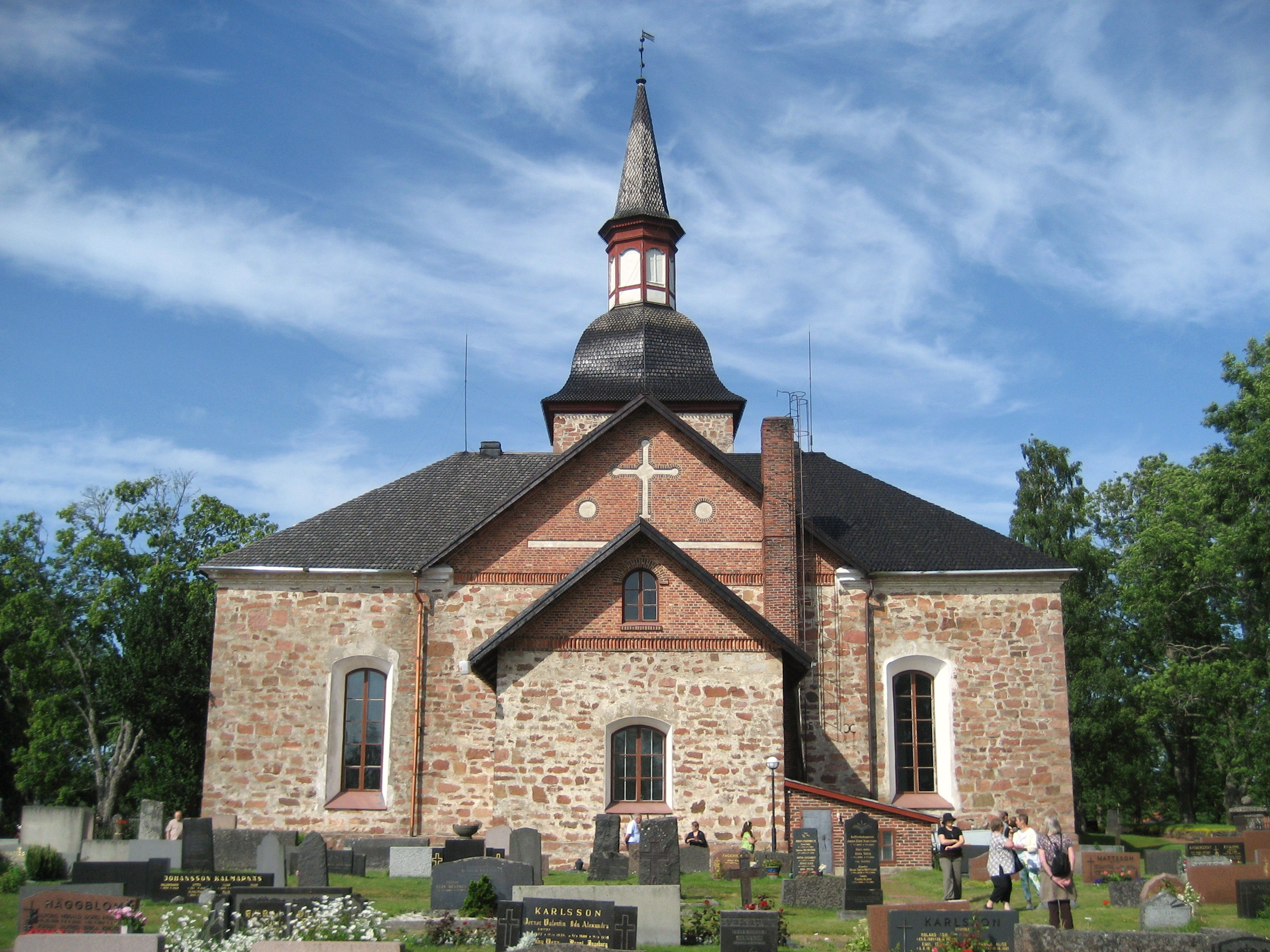
St. Olaf's Church, Jomala, the oldest medieval stone church in Finland

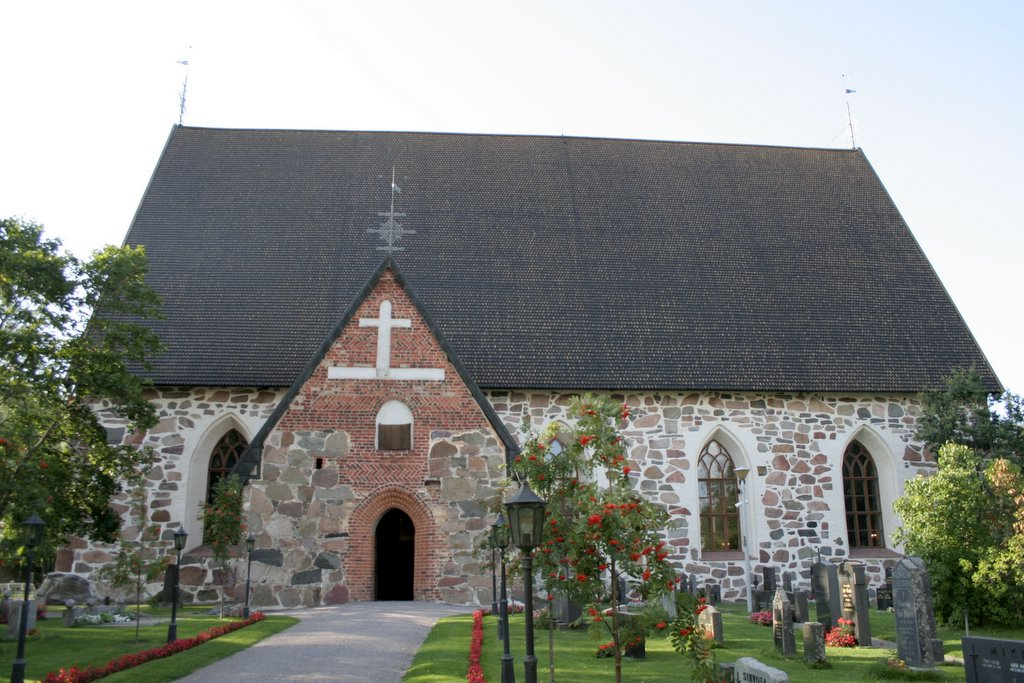
Hollola church, Hollola

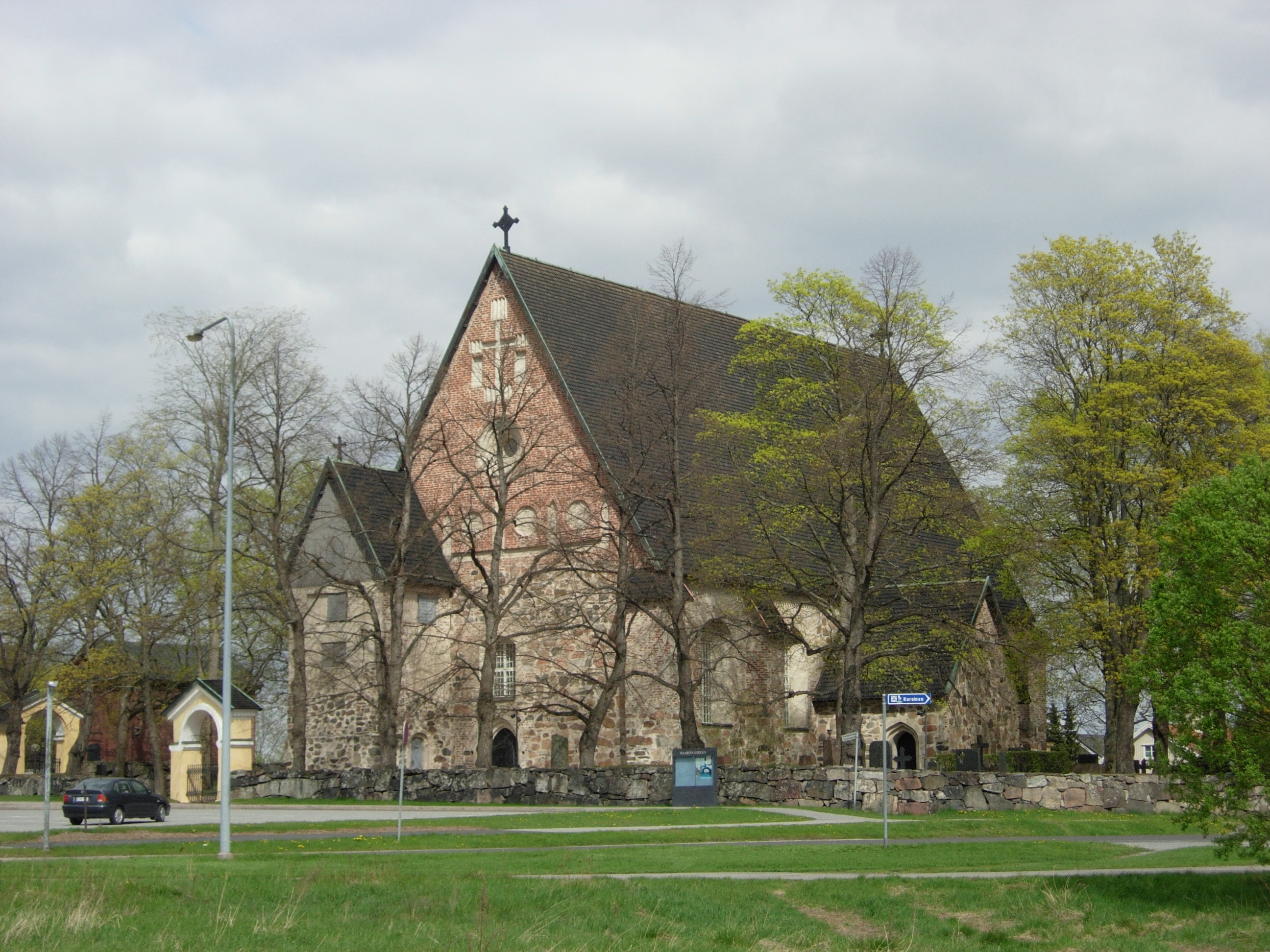
St. Mary's Church, Turku

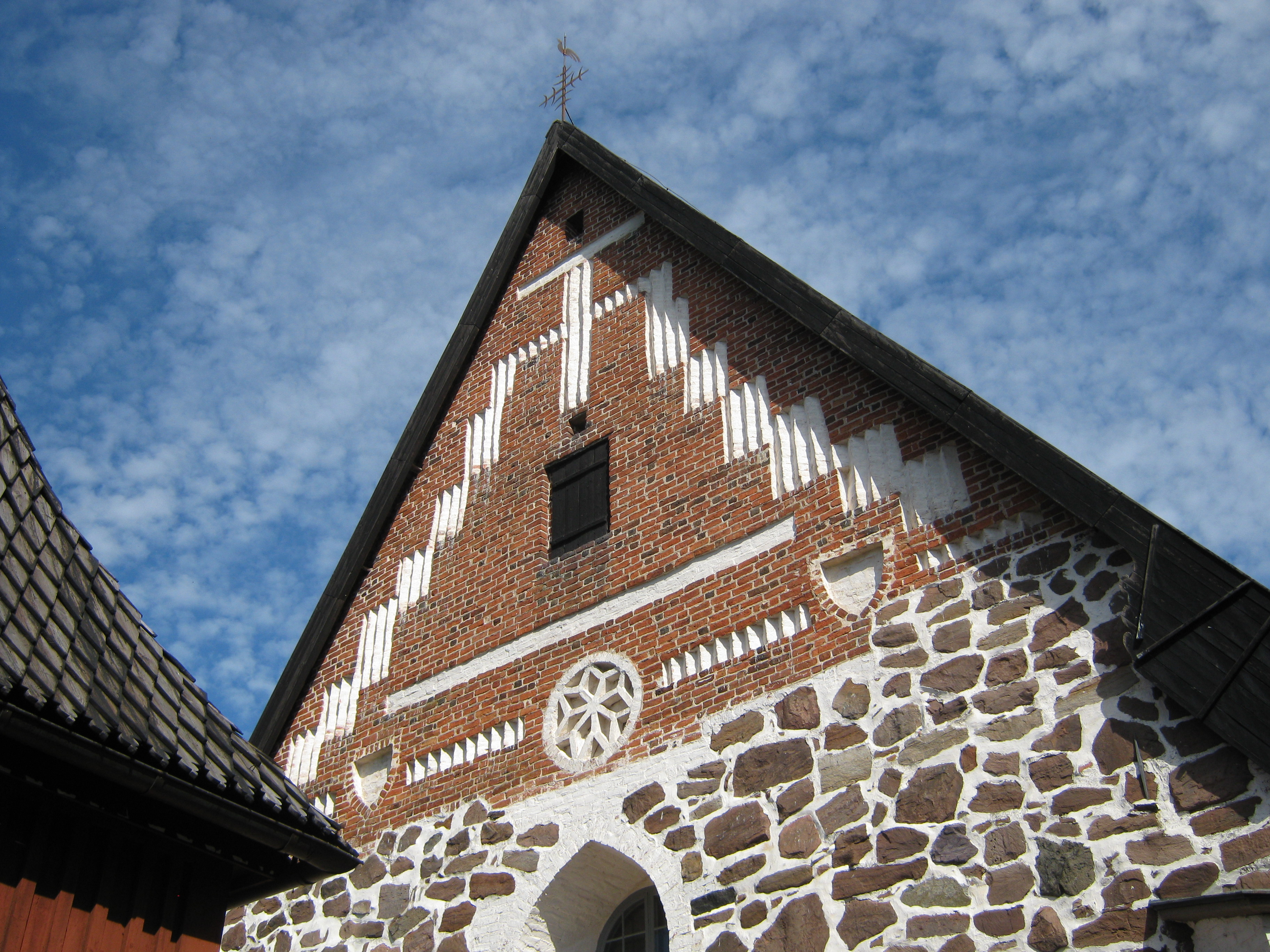
Gable ornaments of St. Olof's Church, Ulvila

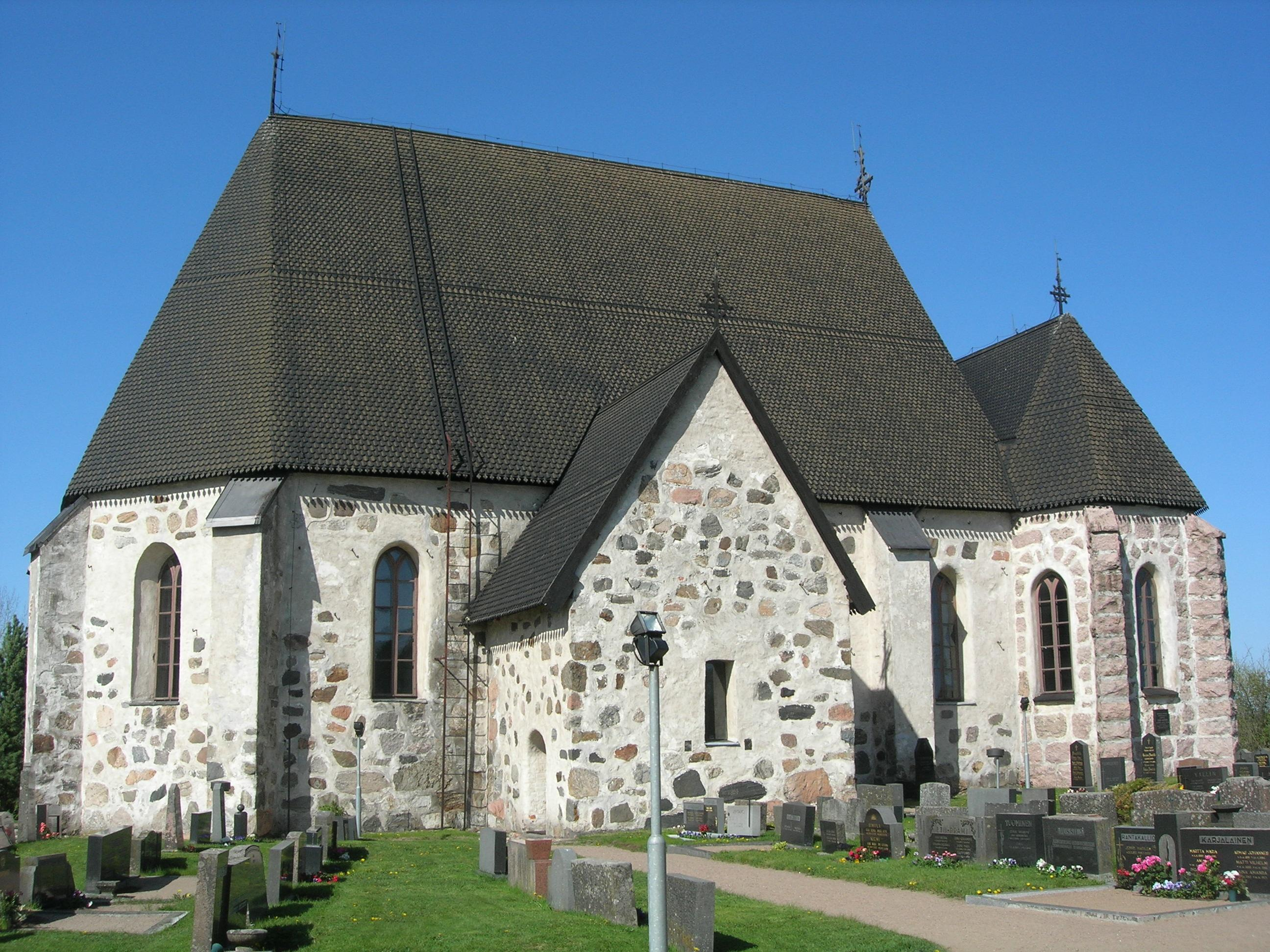
Nousiainen Church, Nousiainen

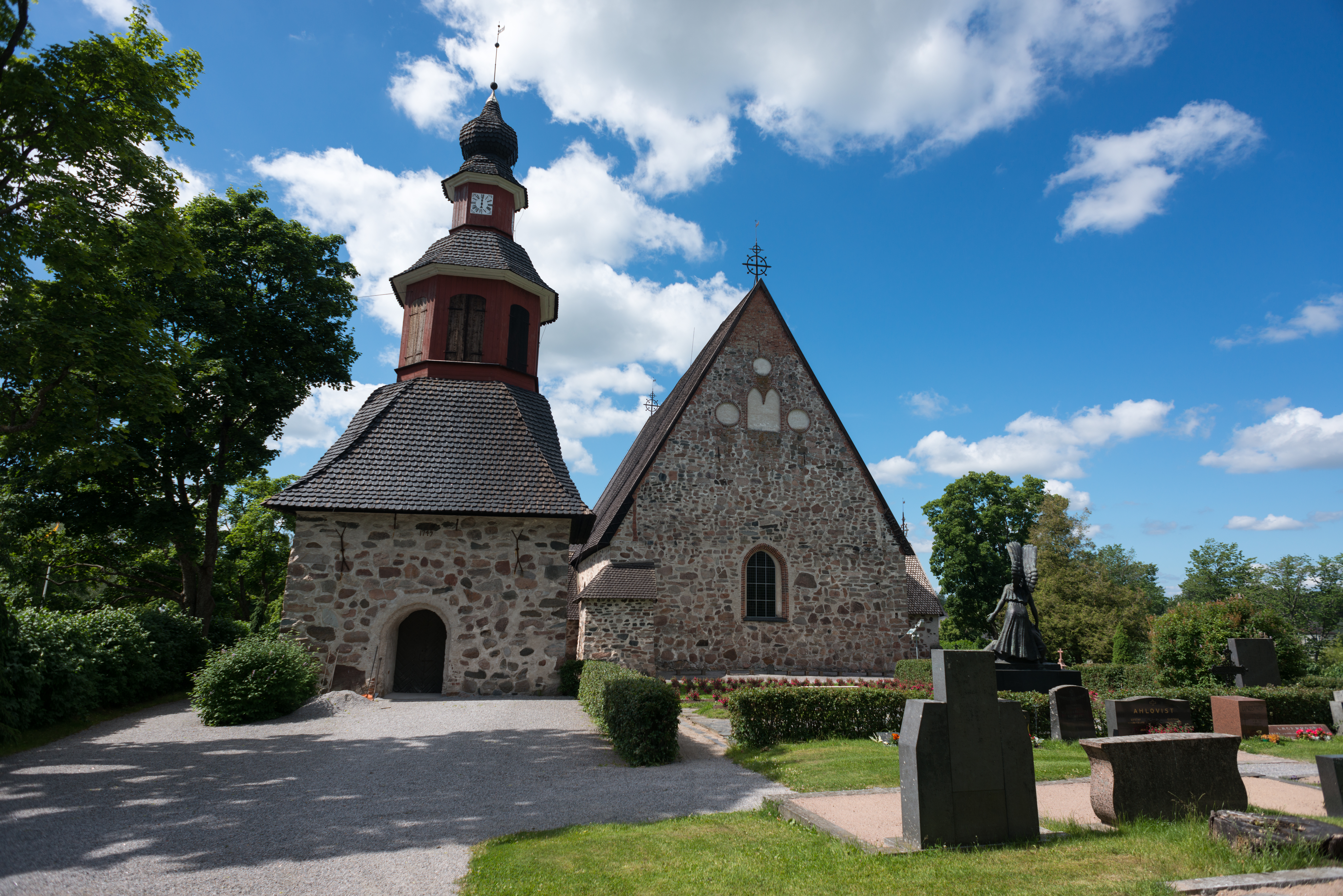
Perniö Church and bell tower, Perniö

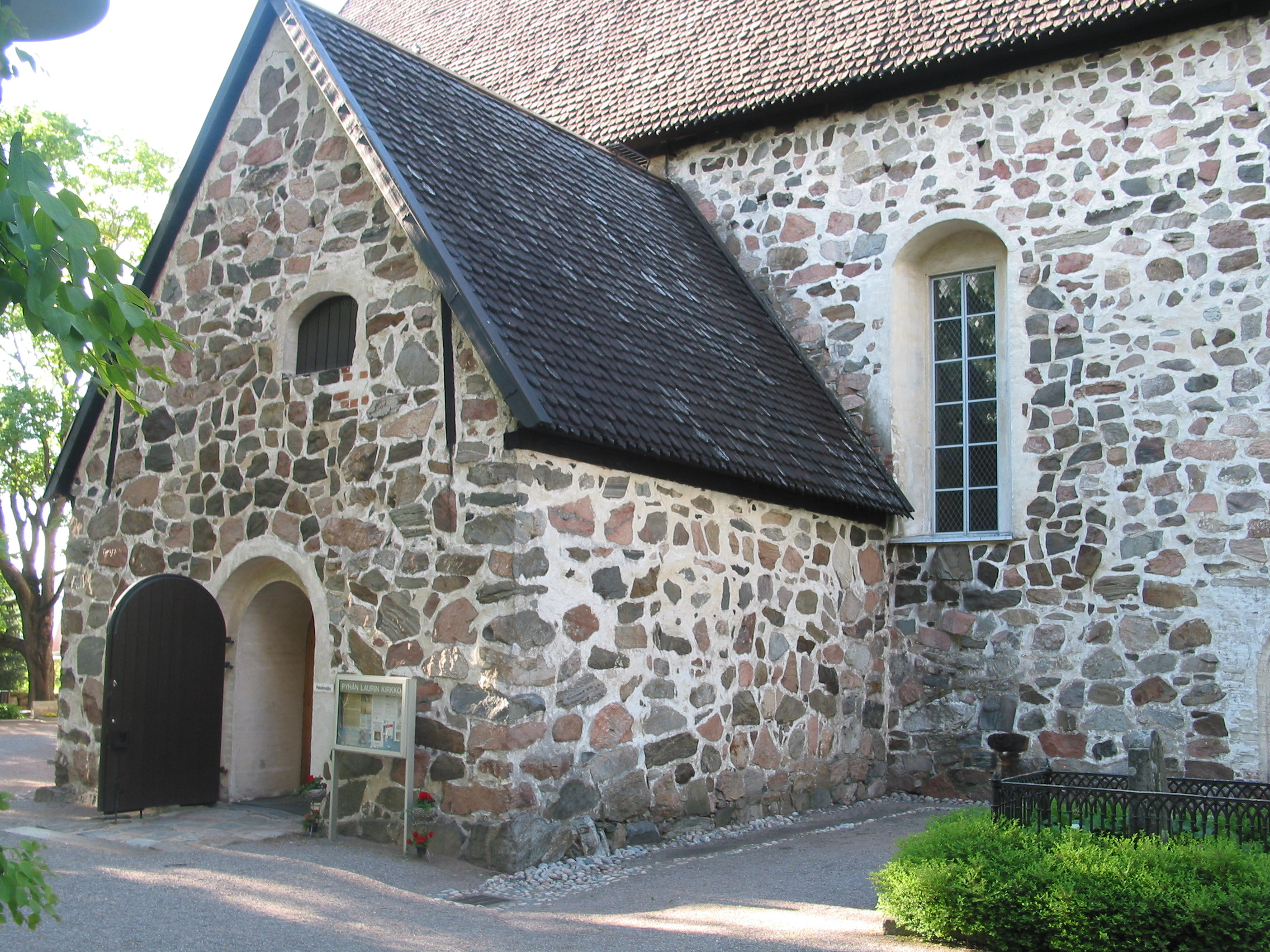
Weaponhouse of the St. Lawrence's Church, Lohja

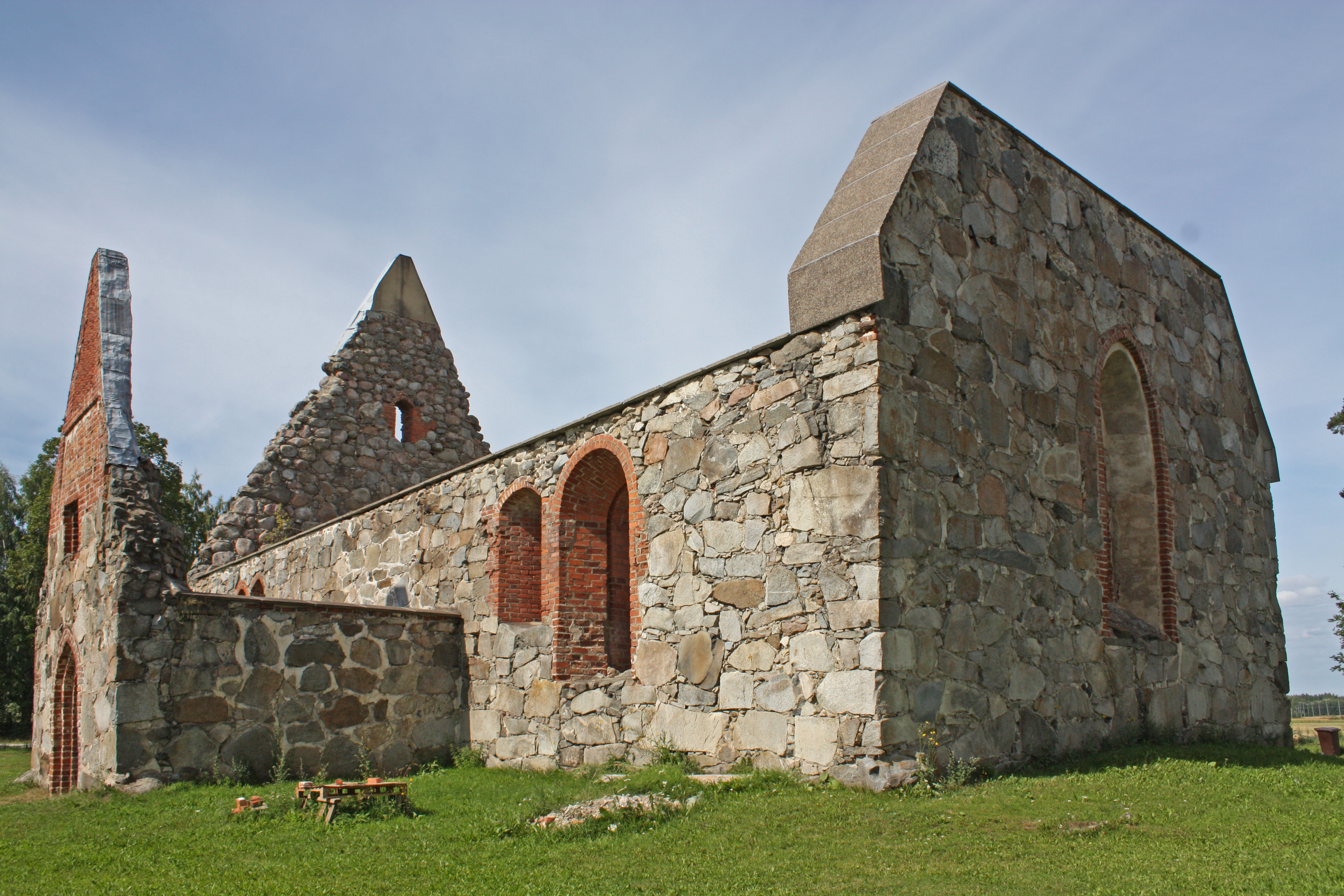
Ruins of Pälkäne church, Pälkäne

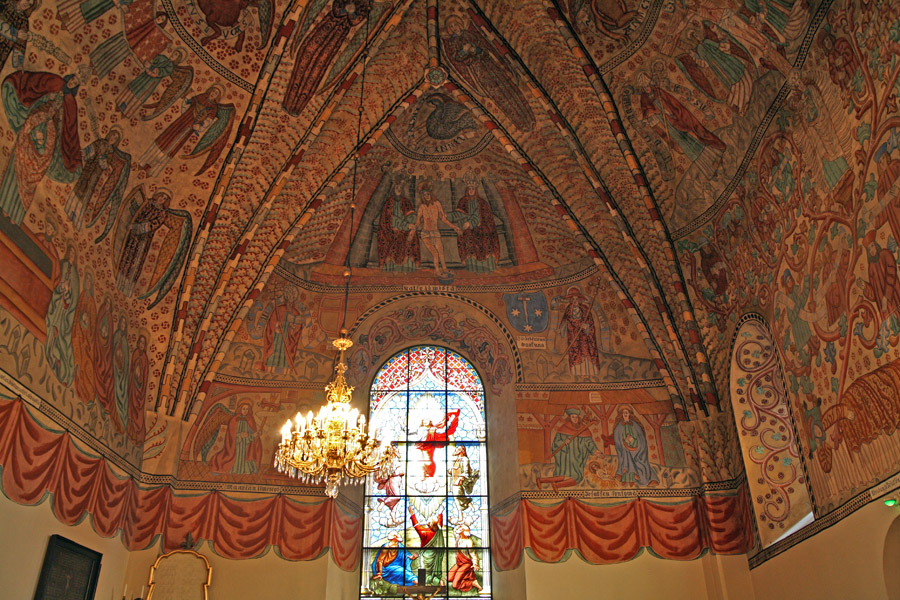
Interior of the Church of the Holy Cross, Rauma

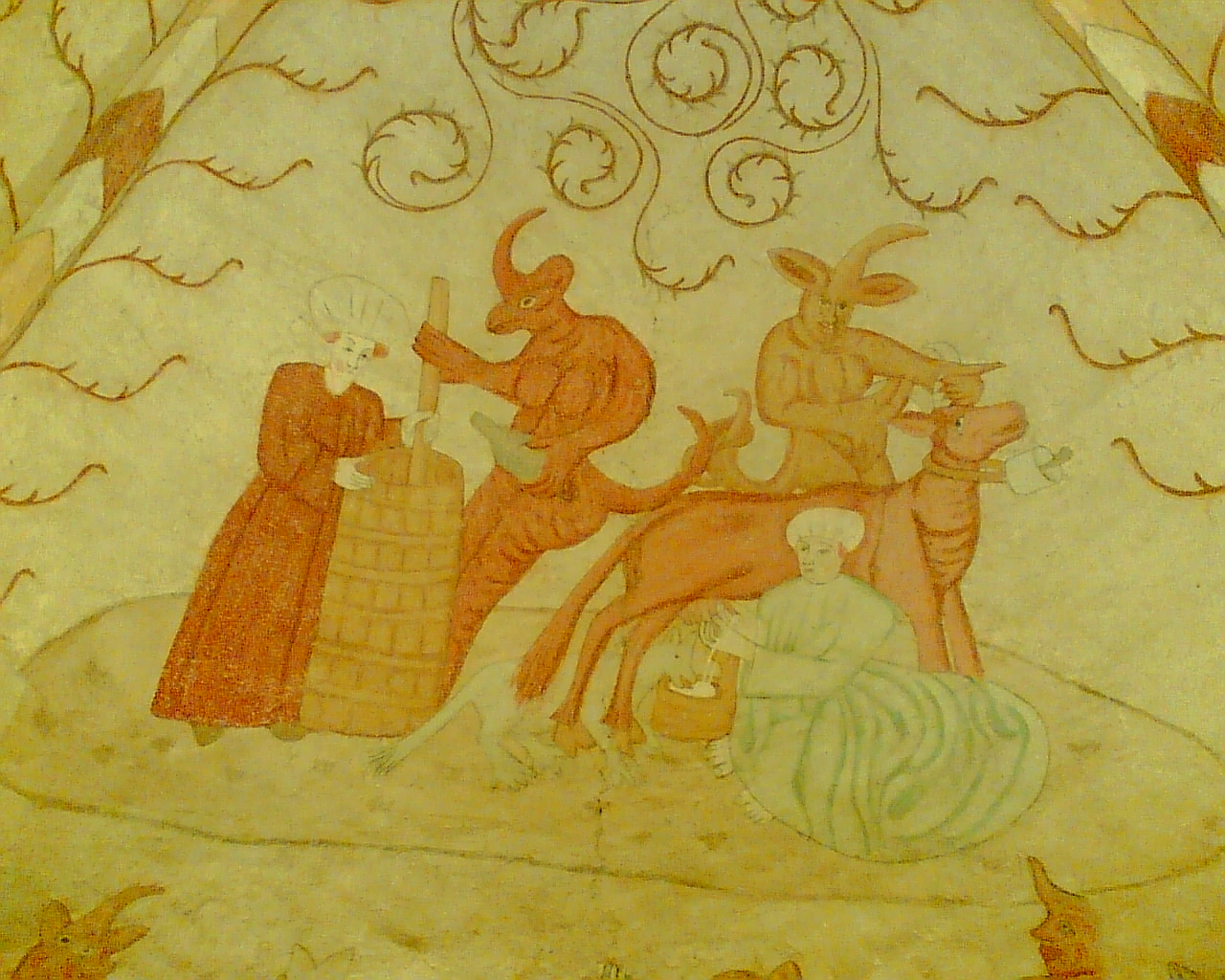
Painting in St. Lawrence's Church, Lohja

== See also ==
- List of medieval stone churches in Finland
