= Karuna Church =

Church in Sauvo, Finland

Coordinates: 60°16′08″N 022°32′41″E

The Karuna church is a stone church located in Karuna Sauvo, Southwest Finland, Finland. It was designed by Finnish church architect Josef Stenbäck and built in 1908–1910. The style of the building reflects National Romantic style with Jugendstil features.

The bell tower is located in the southeast corner of the structure the bells of which were made in 1689. The church has the capacity to seat 480 people. The altar paintings were created by Ilmari Launis.

The older wooden church has been transported into the open-air museum of Seurasaari, Helsinki.

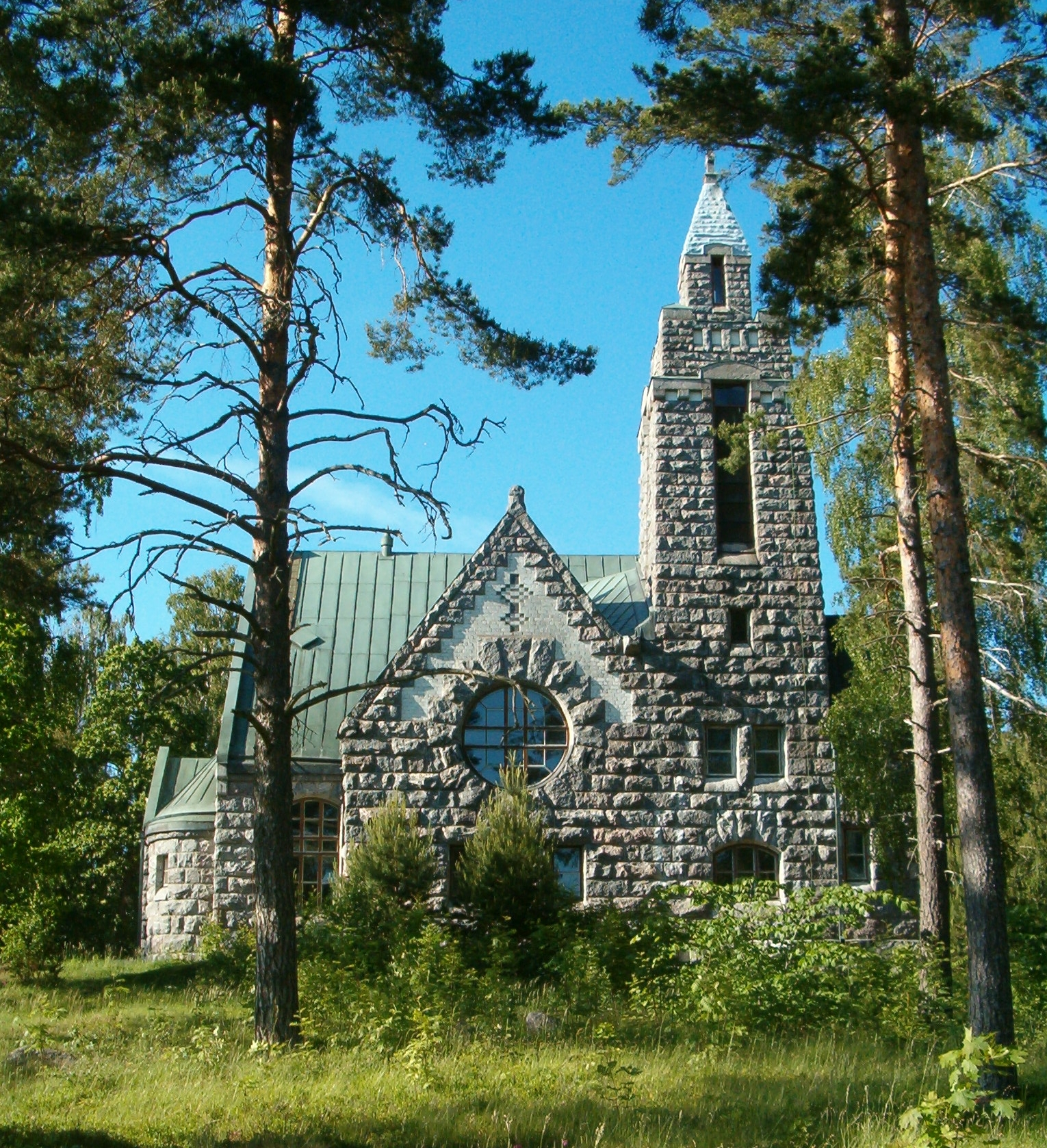

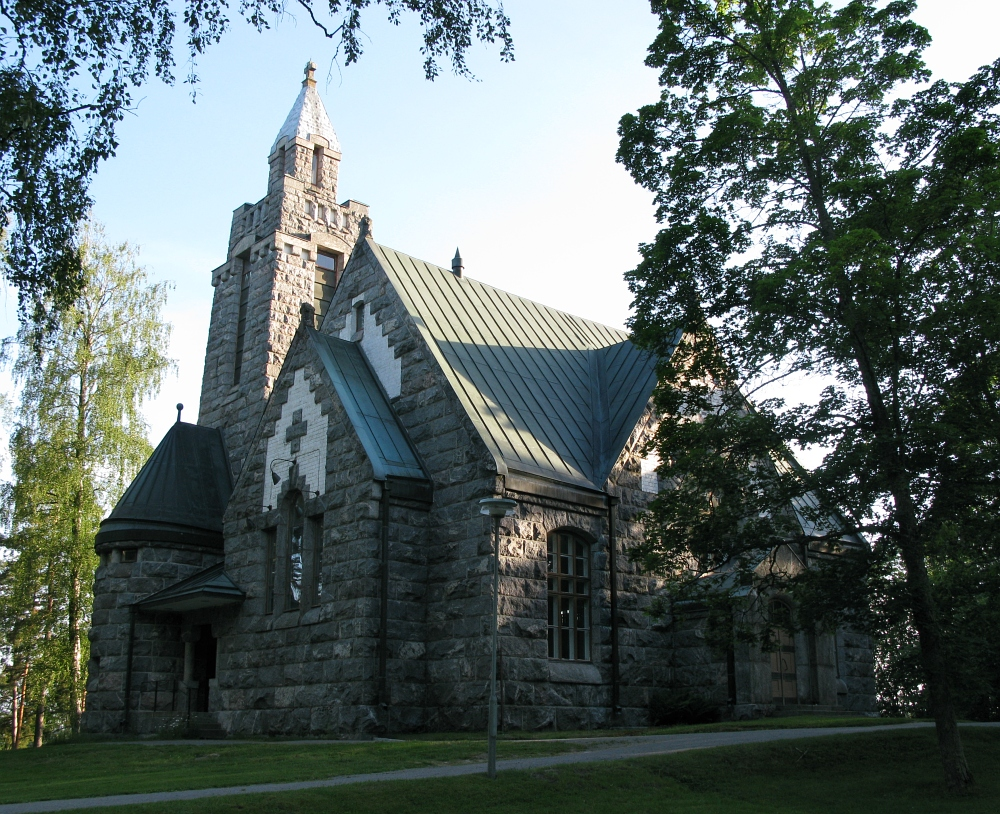

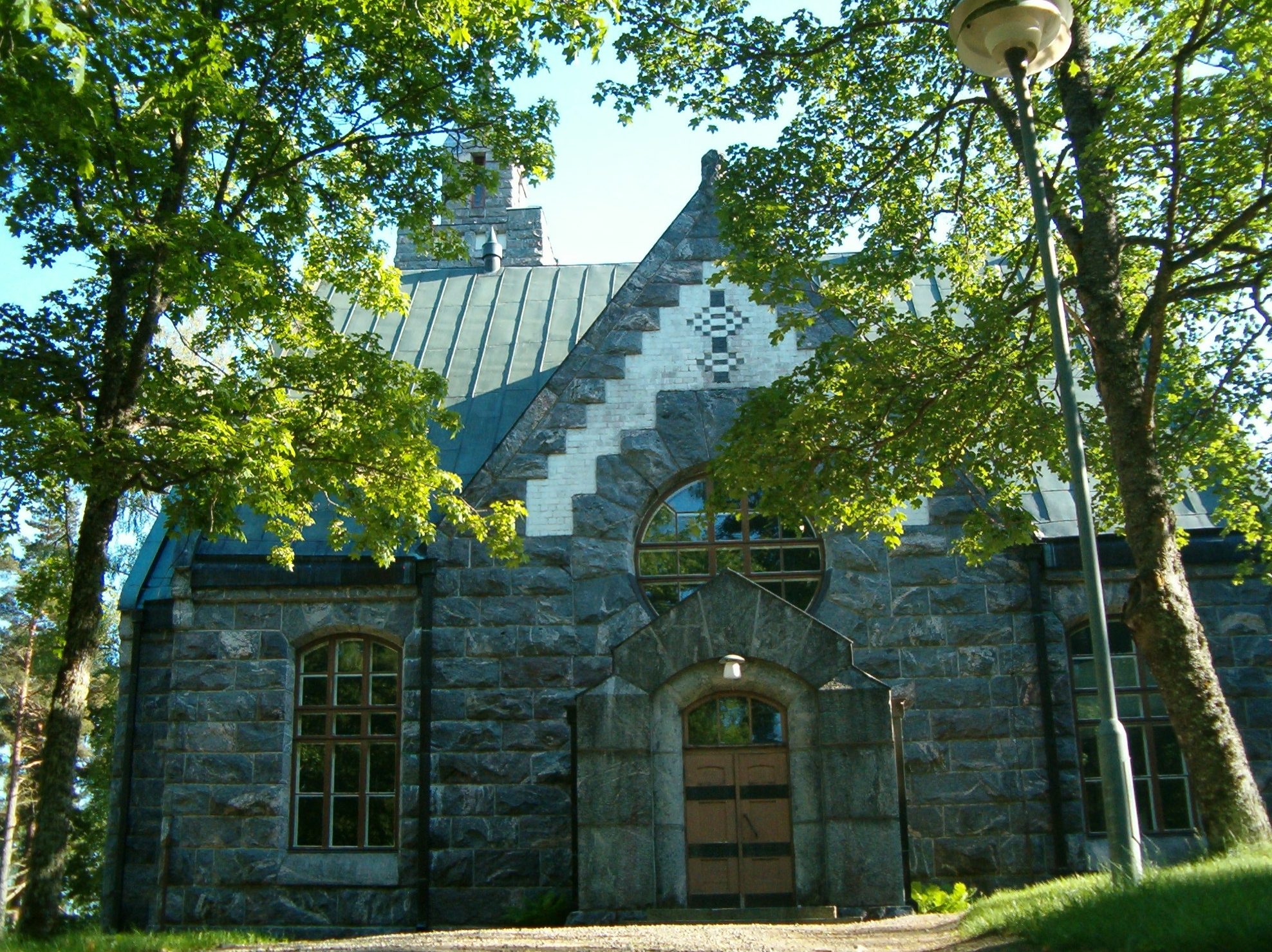

== See also ==
- Karuna
