= Muyezersky =

Muyezersky (masculine), Muyezerskaya (feminine), or Muyezerskoye (neuter) may refer to:

- Muyezersky District, a district of the Republic of Karelia, Russia
- Muyezersky (urban-type settlement), an urban-type settlement in the Republic of Karelia, Russia
- Muyezerskoye Urban Settlement, a municipal formation which the urban-type settlement of Muyezersky in Muyezersky District of the Republic of Karelia, Russia is incorporated as
