= Rugozero =

Municipality and village in Russia

Coordinates: 64°5′N 32°47′E

Location of Rugozero in the Muyezersky District in the Republic of Karelia, Russia.

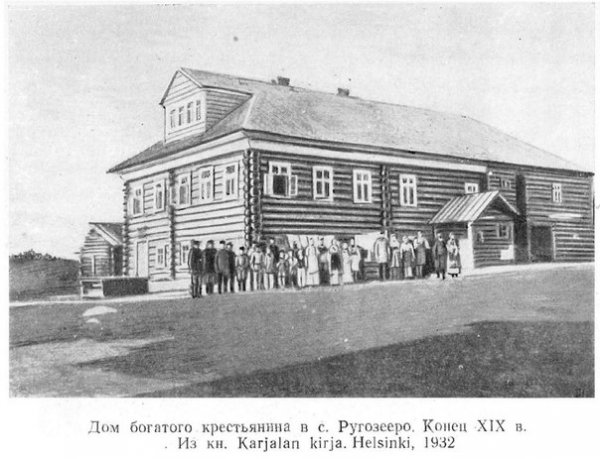
A wooden house in Rugozero in 1920.

Rugozero (Russian: Ругозеро; Karelian: Rugarvi; Finnish: Rukajärvi) is a rural municipality and its central village in the Muyezersky District in the Republic of Karelia in Russia. It is located on the eastern shore of Lake Rugozero, 84 km northeast of Muyezersky. The population of the village is 753 and that of the municipality is 909 (as of 2012).

== Geography and population ==
The area of the Rugozero municipality is 3,990 square kilometres (1,540 sq mi). It is bordered to the northeast by Sosnovets in the Belomorsky District, to the east by Chyorny Porog in the Segezhsky District, to the south by Padany in the Medvezhyegorsky District, to the south by Muyezersky and to the northwest by Ledmozero in the Muyzezersky District. Most of the area is forest and lakes.

The area of the village mostly belongs to the Upper lands of Western Karelia. Its terrain is characterised by a hilly till area and numerous small lakes. The largest of the lakes include Lake Ondozero on the municipality border and Lake Yevzhozero, Lake Rugozero, Rokshozero and Unusozero. Rivers include the Onda, Gonguzoya, Koyvu and Moynan-Amindomaoya. Near the village of Rugozero is a swamp protected as a natural monument.

As well as the central village, the municipality includes the villages of Ondozero and Severny, located to the north of Lake Rugozero. The population of Ondozero is 153 and that of Severny is 3 (as of 2012). The population of the municipality decreased by 21 percent from 2001 to 2012. According to the 2010 census, the nationalities include 58% Russians, 26% Karelians, 11% Belarusians and 3% Ukrainians.

== History ==
The earliest descriptions of Rugozero belonging to Novgorodian Lapland are from the 16th century. In 1578 a Voivode of the Czar built a fort in the village, which managed to deter an attack by the Swedish in the same year. In 1597 a church was built in Rugozero and an Eastern Orthodox church was founded. According by a check book in the same year the Rugozero pogost had 44 inhabited houses. In 1707 the number of houses had grown to 75. The inhabitants of the region practiced slash-and-burn farming, fishing and fur hunting and provided iron ore to the factories in Petrozavodsk and Konchezero The Swedish destroyed the villages of Rugozero in 1718, and the Finnish people of Lieksa and Ilomantsi also destroyed the villages in 1742.

In the early 20th century the villages of the area formed the Rugozero volost in the Povenets uyezd in the Olonets Governorate, which was a municipality covering the obshchinas of Kimasozero, Korguba and Rugozero. Other villages included Ondozero, Ledmozero and Tiksha. The Rugozero volost was bordered to the north by the Kontokki, Yushkozero and Tunguda volosts in the Kem uyezd in the Arkhangelsk Governorate, to the southeast by Padany and Reboly volosts in the Povenets uyezd and to the west by Finland. In 1905 the volost had 29 villages and 2200 inhabitants. The Rugozero village had a school, 108 houses and 604 inhabitants. In the early 1920s the Kimasozero volost was separated from Rugozero.

The Rugozero church school was first mentioned in 1841. In 1879 the village got a school financed by the ministry of education, in 1910 a library and in 1912 a zemstvo post station. After the October Revolution Rugozero suffered from famine and unrest caused by the Kindred Nation Wars. In November 1921 Finns invading the village shot 11 communists and three officials in Rugozero. After the war most of the people fled to Finland.

In 1927 the Rugozero district was founded from the volosts of Rugozero and Kimasozero, as well as parts of Tunguda, Yushkozero and Kontokki, which included the selsoviets of Kimasozero, Luvozero, Ondozero, Andronova Gora and Rugozero. According to the 1926 census the 43 villages of the district had a population of 2500, most of which were Karelians. The centre of the district had a population of almost 500. From 1932 to 1934 and again from 1948 onwards the Reboly district was also part of the Rugozero district. The Rugozero district was discontinued and attached to the Segezha district in 1958.

The 1920s and 1930s were a period of strong economic and cultural growth in Rugozero. In 1929 the Rugozero forestry district was founded and a kolkhoz in the following year. Life was darkened by the Great Purge starting in 1935, which targeted hundreds of people in Rugozero.

=== Rugozero in the Continuation War ===
During the Continuation War from 1941 to 1944 the Rugozero region was invaded by the Finns. The Soviet Union mobilised its forces and evacuated the civilian population of the area to the Arkhangelsk and Kirov oblasts and to the Ural region. The Finns sent the 14th division to the area, consisting of the infantry regiments 10, 52 and 31. The commander of the Rukajärvi region was Colonel Erkki Raappana. There were large battles in the Rukajärvi-Ontajärvi area particularly in 1941 and from 1943 to 1944. The Rugozero village was conquered on 11 September 1941. There were numerous military patrols on both sides of the frontier during the whole war. The Finns kept the positions they achieved in Rukajärvi up to the end of the war. Finnish positions included the outposts Sukellusvene ("submarine"), Peukalonniemi, Kotiniemi, Pallo ("ball") and Piippu ("pipe"). The largest battle in the Rukajärvi area was fought in Tahkokoski in 1944. The largest motti battle was fought in the Omelia motti. The Soviets shot their largest artillery concentrations to the Pallo outpost from 1943 to 1944.

=== After the war ===
After the war, the population returned to Rugozero. The few houses that survived the war included the Pronyayev house, which had acted as the command centre of the Finns. The Rugozero forest industry resumed operations in 1946. The Rugozero and Ondozero kolkhozes were joined in the early 1950s and were later formed into an auxiliary functionality of the forest industry. The Rugozero fur sovkhoz was founded from it in 1969.

== Traffic, economy and services ==
A highway from Kochkoma to Kostomuksha via Tiksha and Ledmozero passes through Rugozero, with a branch towards Ondozero. There is a bus line from Ondozero to Muyezersky.

The most important local employers include public services, the military and the road council. There is a forestry area in the municipality. Farming is represented by one private farmstead and 26 communal farms, which provide milk, meat, eggs, potatoes and vegetables. 48% of the working-age population is unemployed and 13% work outside the municipality.

Services in the central village include a school, a hobby centre of children, a culture and leisure centre, a library, a small policlinic, a post office and a number of shops.

== Attractions and tourism ==
There have been numerous findings of Stone Age dwellings in the area. Building landmarks include the eukterion and grain storehouse built in Ondozero in the late 19th century as well as the Pronyayev house built in Rugozero in 1858. The municipality includes graves of Red Army soldiers and civilians killed in the Kindred Nation Wars and in the Winter War. Rugozero also has a memorial to the people shot in 1921 and there is a cannon built in the memory of the frontier in the Continuation War along the road to Kochkoma to the east of the village.

The village includes the hiking trails of the Onda river and Ondozero-Piziniemi. There is family accommodation in Ondozero.

== Sources ==
- Generalnyi plan Rugozerskogo selskogo poselenija Mujezerskogo munitsipalnogo raiona Respubliki Karelija. Tom II: Materialy po obosnovaniju. Pojasnitelnaja zapiska 2012. Petrozavodsk: Galana. Accessed on 27 October 2013. (In Russian)
- Istoriaja Karelii s drevneiših vremjon do naših dnei. Petrozavodsk: Periodika, 2001. ISBN 5-88170-049-X.
- Härkönen, Iivo (ed.): Karjalan kirja. Porvoo–Helsinki: Werner Söderström Osakeyhtiö, 1932.
- Pokrovskaja, I. P.: Naselenije Karelii. Petrozavodsk: Karelija, 1978.
- Shema territorialnogo planirovanija munitsipalnogo obrazovanija "Mujezerski munitsipalnyi raion". Tom I: Pojasnitelnaja zapiska k materialam po obosnovaniju, muezersky.ru 2011. Petrozavodsk. Accessed on 27 October 2013. (In Russian)

== Bibliography ==
Bibliography and filmography about Rukajärvi during the Continuation War:

- Lauri Kumlin: Rukajärven suunnan taistelut, 1950.
- Onni Palaste: Raappanan miehet, Rukajärven sissit (documentary book); Korpisodan sankarit
- Antti Tuuri, Rukajärvi series: Rukajärven tiellä, Rukajärven aika, Rukajärven linja
- Olli Saarela: Ambush, film based on the Rukajärvi series by Antti Tuuri and the book Elämä isänmaalle.
- Konstantin Somov: Sibirski batalon. Barnaul 2011. War memories of an Altay battalion from Rukajärvi. (In Russian)
