= Turku Cemetery =

Coordinates: 60°26′0″N 022°18′30″E

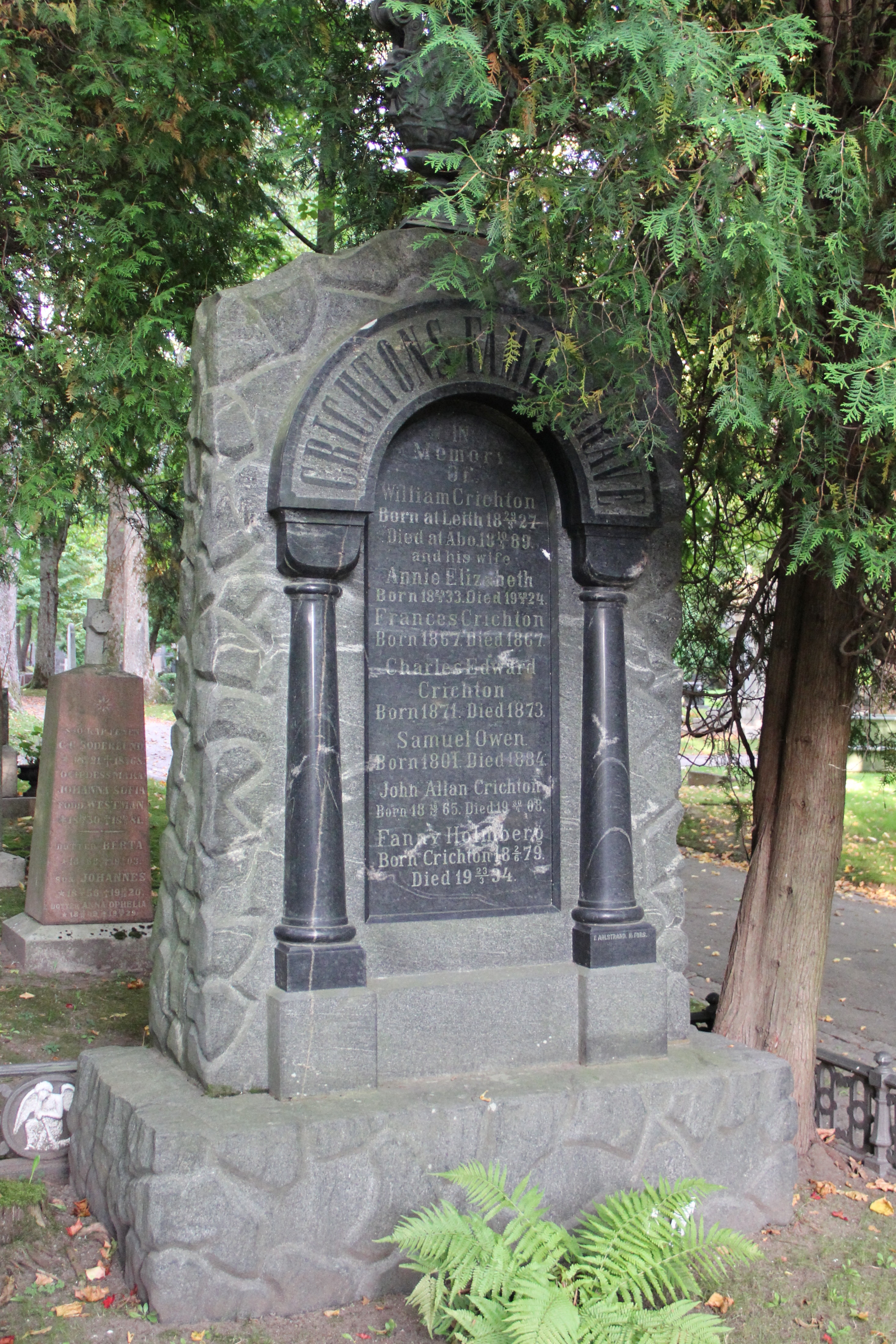
The family grave of William Crichton in Turku Cemetery

Turku Cemetery (Finnish: Turun hautausmaa, Swedish: Åbo begravningsplats) is a cemetery inaugurated in 1807 and located in Vasaramäki on the south-eastern outskirts of the city of Turku.

The drawings of the cemetery has been prepared by the architect Charles Bassi. In the cemetery there are two chapels complexes. The Resurrection Chapel or Ylösnousemuskappeli/Uppståndelsekapellet was completed in 1941 by architect Erik Bryggman. The Heliga Korsets chapel and crematorium is inaugurated in 1967 by architect Pekka Pitkänen.

The first buried person in the cemetery was William Archibald Cramp, who died in 1806 on his way from St. Petersburg to Turku.

== Notable interments ==
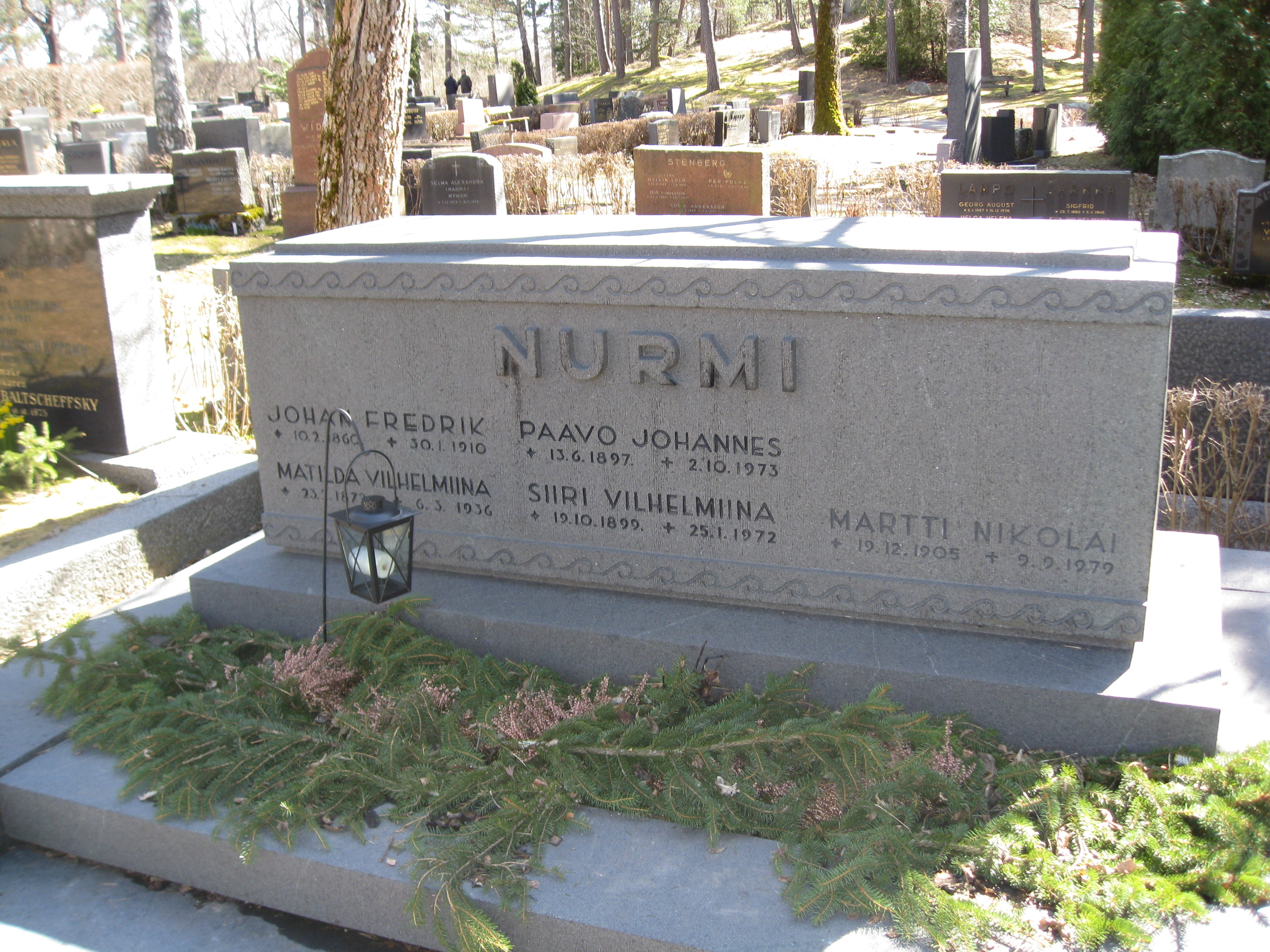
The family grave of Paavo Nurmi

- Gabriel Israel Hartman (1776, Lumparland – 1809, Turku)
- William Crichton (1827, Leith – 1889, Turku)
- Arnold Majewski (1892, Tallinn – 1942, Rukajärvi)
- Akseli Karhi (1891, Turku – 1943)
- Kullervo Hurttia (1915, Eno – 1953)
- Annie Mörk (1887, Hanko – 1959, Helsinki)
- Juho Hemming Airamo (1893, Lieto – 1963, Turku)
- Rami Sarmasto (1938, Sauvo – 1965, Forssa)
- Toivo Aleksi Hämeranta (1900, Tampere – 1969, Turku)
- Senni Nieminen (1905, Turku – 1970, Turku)
- Jarno Saarinen (1945, Turku – 1973, Autodromo Nazionale Monza)
- Paavo Nurmi (1897, Turku – 1973, Helsinki)
- Mirja Mane (1929, Helsinki – 1974, Turku)
- Hugo Österman (1892, Helsinki – 1975, Helsinki)
- Armas Taipale (1890, Helsinki – 1976, Turku)
- Kaarlo Mäkinen (1892, Mariehamn – 1980, Turku)
- Wilho Ilmari (1888, Kymi – 1983, Turku)
- Kalevi Keihänen (1924 Vahto – 1995, Helsinki)
- Voitto Hellstén (1932, Pertteli – 1998, Turku)

== Gallery ==
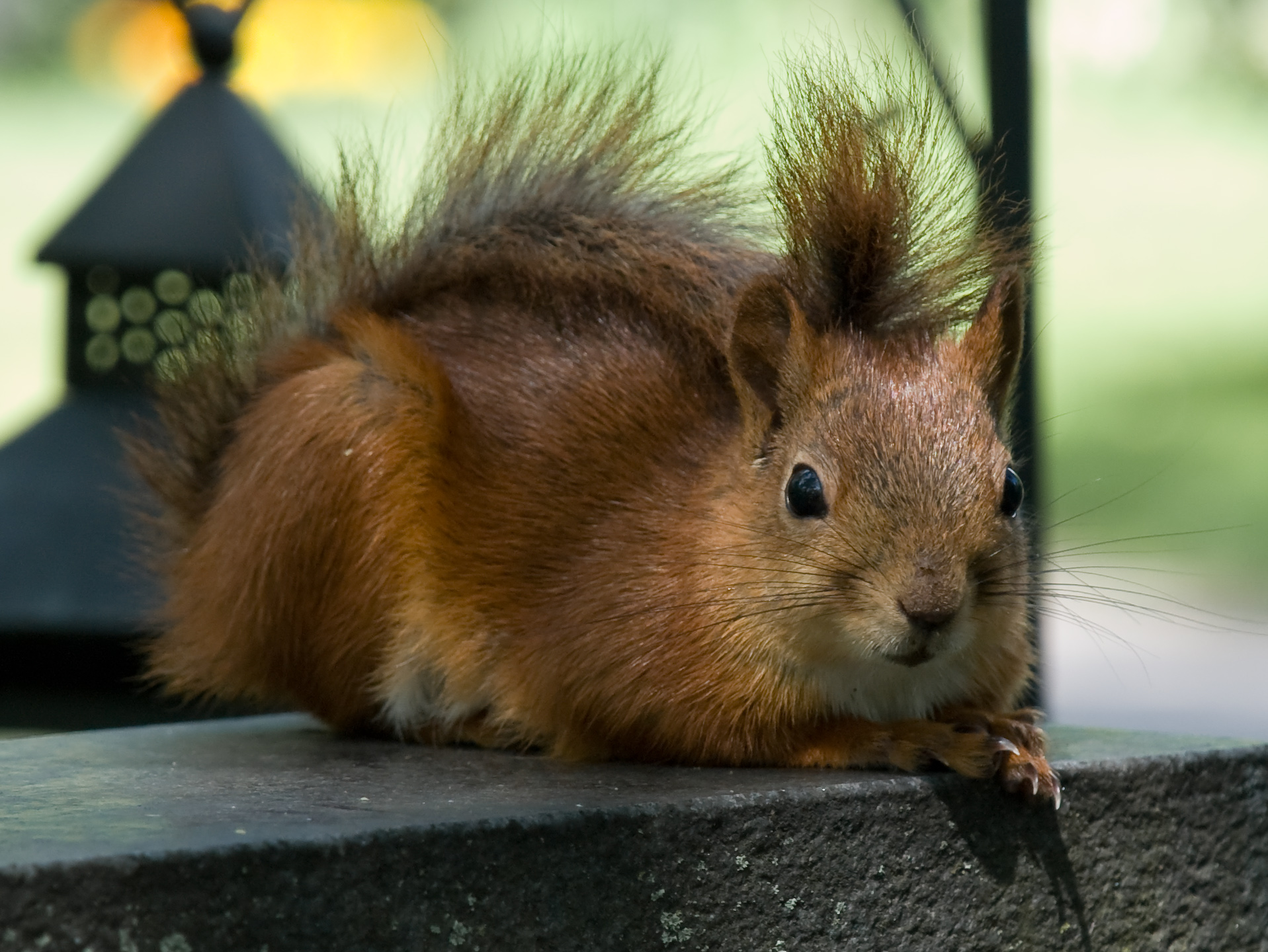
Red squirrel on a tombstone in Turku cemetery

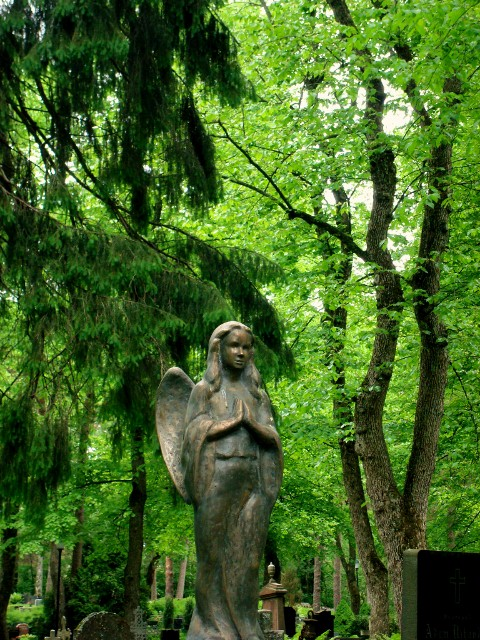
Tombstone angel in Turku cemetery

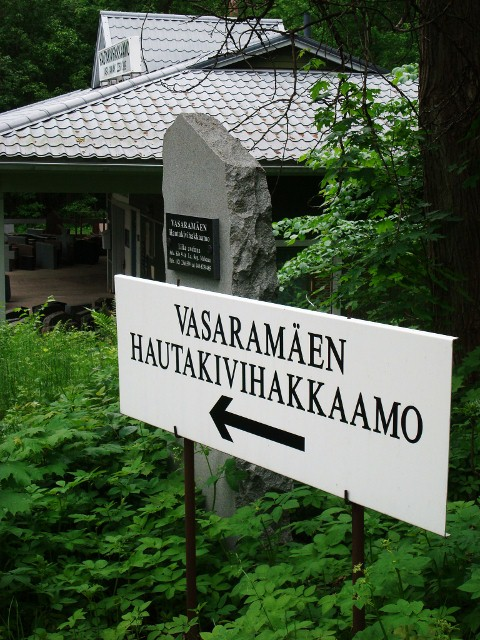
Tombstone workshop in Turku cemetery

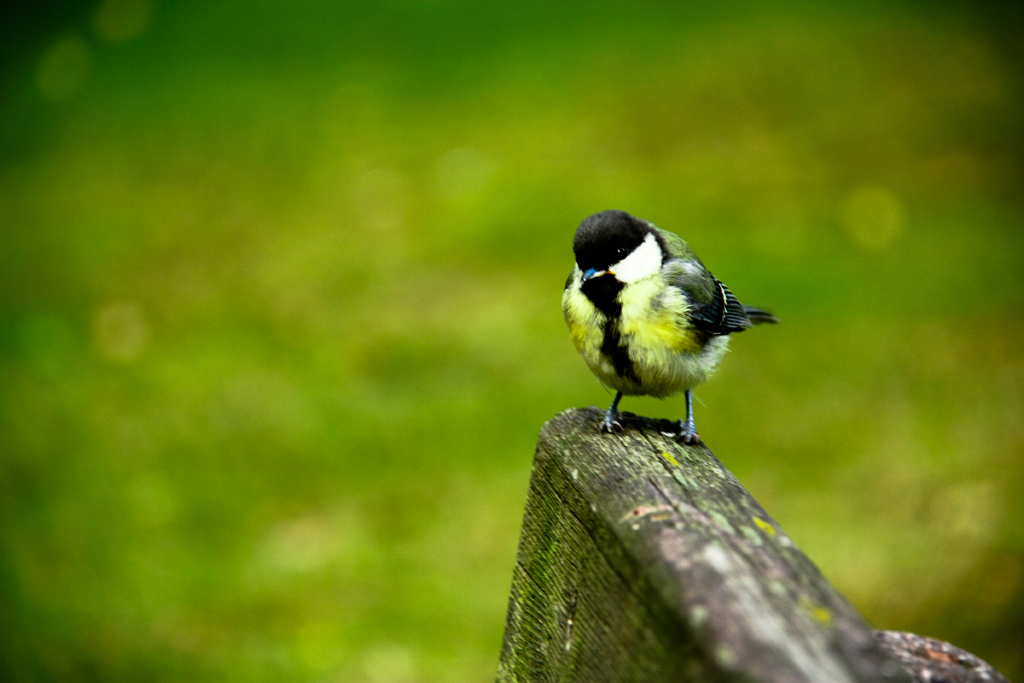
A bird in Turku Cemetery
