= Arnold Majewski =

Finnish soldier

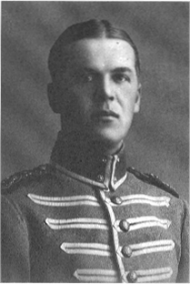
- Majewski in uniform in the early 1920s
- Born: Karl Arnold Woldemar Majewski; 11 December [O.S. 29 November] 1892, Tallinn, Russian Empire (present-day Estonia)
- Died: 10 October 1942 (aged 49); Rukajärvi, Soviet Union (present-day Russia)
- Burial place: Turku Cemetery
- Other name: Arnold Majewski
- Spouse: Helga Sonck-Majewski (m. 1941)
- Military career
- Allegiance: Finland
- Branch: Finnish Army
- Rank: Lieutenant Colonel
- Nickname: Mäski
- Unit: I/JR 10
- Conflicts: Finnish Civil War; Kinship Wars; World War II; Winter War; Continuation War †

Karl Arnold Woldemar Majewski (11 December [O.S. 29 November] 1892 – 10 October 1942) was a legendary Finnish cavalry officer of Polish origin.

== Family and early life ==
Majewski was born in Tallinn. His family can be traced back to his grandfather Wladislaus Majewski (1828 - 1873) who originated from the Warsaw Governorate, had a long military career in the army of the Russian Empire and then settled in Finland through marriage.

Arnold Majewski's father Alexander Majewski, who originated from an old Polish family of soldiers, served in Imperial Russian Army and finally settled to live in Helsinki. Arnold Majewski's mother was the Finnish Irene Hellman.

Majewski studied in 1912 in Turku. After matriculation, Majewski had had enough of school and travelled to Siberia in search for gold, and then travelled across the Far East and North America until finally settling in St. Petersburg in Russia.

== Finnish Civil War ==
When the Finnish Civil War started, Majewski moved back to Finland. He fought in the civil war as a volunteer in the White Army cavalry under Georg Elfvengren of Karelian Forces. He took part in fights at Vyborg, Terijoki and Rautu.

After the war he continued his military career, completed officer training in Joensuu and became a cavalry captain. In the 1920s and 1930s, Majewski served in Häme Regiment in Lappeenranta. He became head of squadron in 1926, and completed the commander course in 1929. By that time, Majewski, nicknamed "Mäski" among his comrades, was already famous for his bohemian lifestyle and extravagant partying during his free time.

== Marriage ==
In 1941, Majewski married pharmacist Helga Sonck-Majewski (née Sonck, born 26 December 1916 in Tallinn - died 12 March 2015 in Porvoo). The marriage did not result in children.

Majewski is said to have contemplated between Helga Sonck and another woman who worked as bank clerk. He is said to have pondered: "I have two girlfriends, of which one is a pharmacist and the other is a bank clerk at Yhdyspankki. If I choose the pharmacist, I will never run out of alcohol, but if I choose the bank clerk, I will never run out of credit." In the end, the pharmacist won.

== Second World War ==
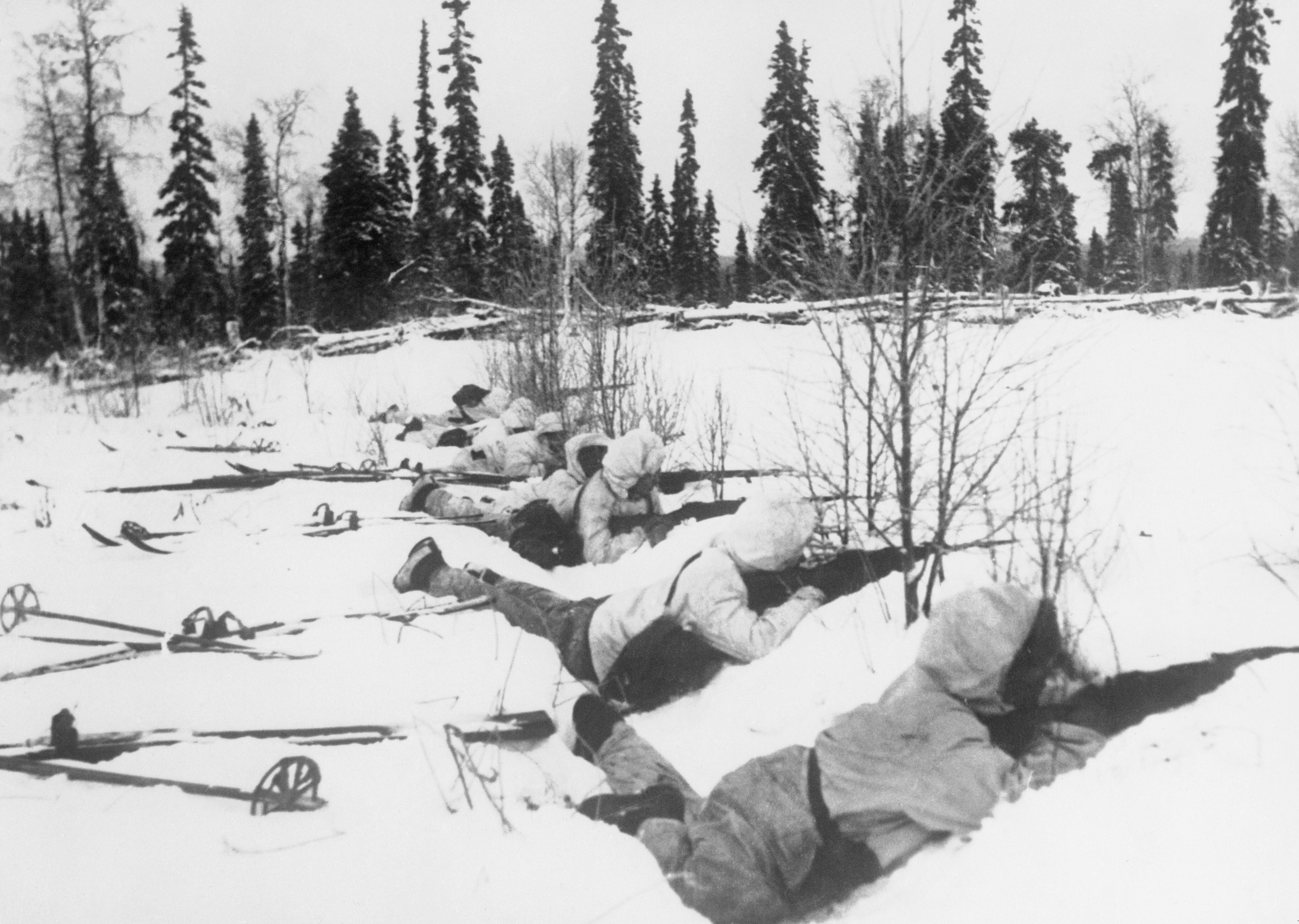

In the Winter War Majewski served in Ladoga Karelia and fought in the Battle of Kollaa. He was the youngest battalion commander in Finnish forces, and quickly became known as daredevil officer who was never afraid to expose himself to enemy fire.

After the Winter War Majewski was promoted to Major. There was even a proposal to award him the Mannerheim Cross First Class, which has only been awarded twice: to Marshal Carl Gustaf Emil Mannerheim himself and to General Erik Heinrichs, but nothing ever came from this proposal.

In the Continuation War, Majewski was famous for his 100 km winter raid to Mai Guba (north of Sekehe) behind the Soviet lines in January 1942.

Because of his Polish background and travels around the world in his youth, Majewski's command of the Finnish language was not perfect, which gave further colour to stories told about him. At the start of the raid to Mai Guba Majewski gave the following description of the mission to his troops, which later became famous:

Hyvät härrat. Me ole saatu Marsalkkalta yks kunniakas tehtävä. Me hiihtää Muurmannin rata, pane rata poikki ja anta ryssä pistä meidät motti. Sitte me ole kolme päivä motissa ja sitte me hiihtä takasi. Onko selvä, onko mite kysymistä?

Gentlemen. We have received an honourable mission from the Marshal. We have to ski to the Muurmanni railway track, cut the track and let the Russians surround us. Then we have to remain surrounded for three days and then ski back. Am I making this clear, or are there any questions?

Majewski was hit by shrapnel and badly wounded just before the end of the war. He was promoted after the end of the Winter War.

In the Continuation War he fought at Rukajärvi front, where he earned a reputation as one of the bravest commanders. He was promoted as Lieutenant Colonel in April 1942.

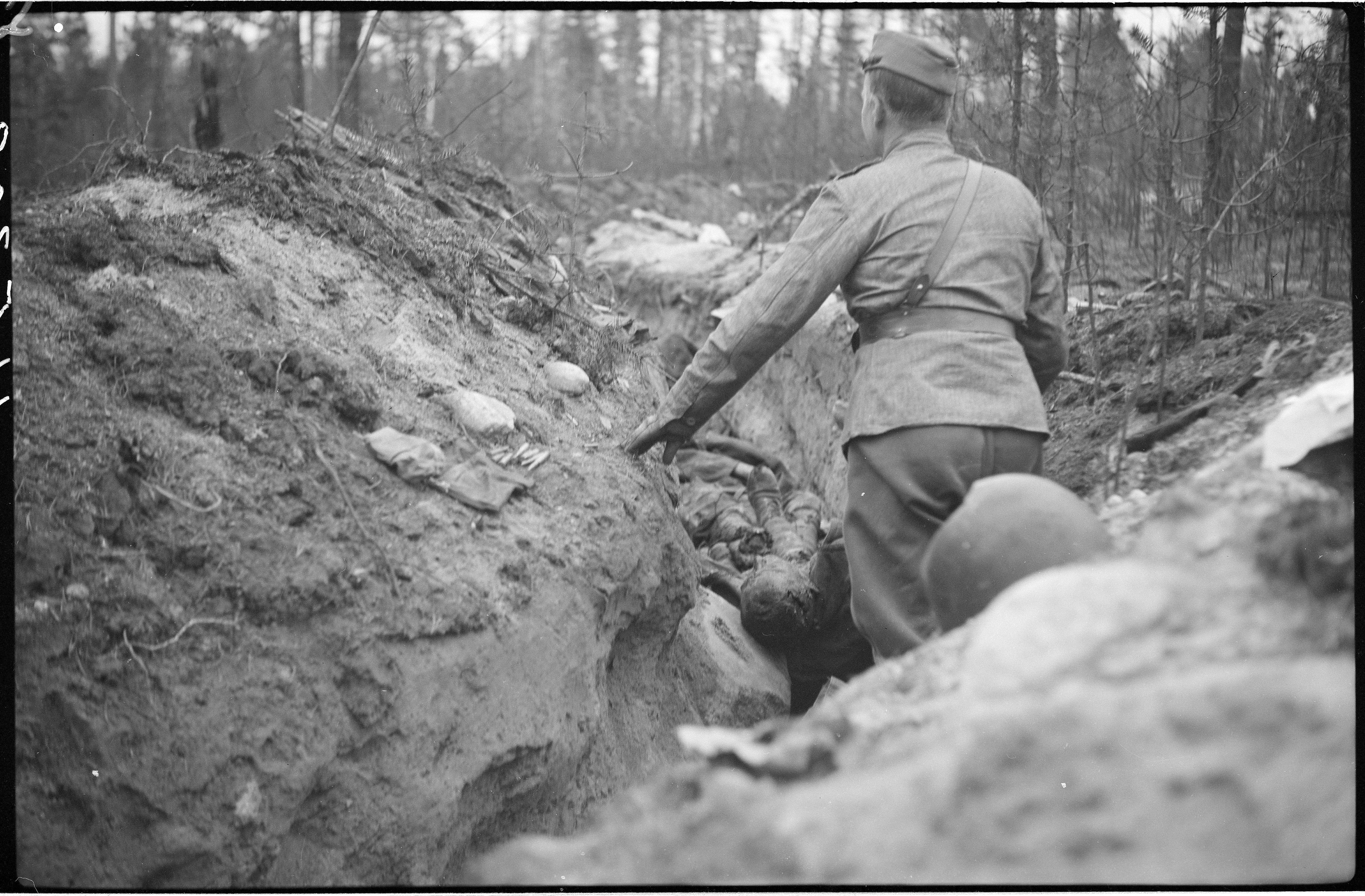
Arnold Majewski (standing, with his back to the camera) inspecting the Soviet dead, mere seconds before being killed in action.

On 10 October 1942 Majewski was killed in action at Rukajärvi when he was presenting the position of his battalion to the TK companies after the Finns had resisted an attack from a Soviet battalion. As Majewski was counting the Soviet dead, he carelessly peered over the edge of the trench and was immediately shot by a Soviet sniper.

Majewski was buried in the Majewski family grave at the Turku Cemetery.

== Bibliography ==
- Vesa Nenye; Peter Munter; Toni Wirtanen; Chris Birks (24 March 2016). Finland at War: the Continuation and Lapland Wars 1941–45. Osprey Publishing.
- Ilkka Enkenberg (10 September 2014). "Jatkosota, osa 4/5: Kaukopartiot" (in Finnish).
- "Mai Guba Itä-Viena" (in Finnish).
- Robert Brantberg (2013). Everstiluutnantti Arnold Majewski – Rukajärven legenda (in Finnish). Revontuli. ISBN 978-952-6665-05-4.
