= Karuna, Finland =

Former municipality of Finland

Karuna
- Former municipality
- Coat of arms

- Location of Karuna in Finland.
- Interactive map of Karuna
- Location within Southwest Finland Location within Finland Location within Europe
- Country: Finland
- Province: Turku and Pori
- Charter: 1869
- Consolidated to Sauvo: 1969

Area
  - Land: 88.5 km^{2} (34.2 sq mi)

Population (1960-12-31)
  - Total: 1,246
  - Density: 14.1/km^{2} (36.5/sq mi)
- Time zone: UTC+02:00 (EET)
  - Summer (DST): UTC+03:00 (EEST)

Karuna was a municipality in Southwest Finland region of Western Finland Province, Finland, until 1969 when it merged into the municipality of Sauvo. Part of the former municipality, the village of Sandö, was merged into the municipality of Kimito. In 1963, Karuna had 1,213 inhabitants. About 700 people inhabit the area currently. A peculiarity regarding the church of Karuna is that the older wooden church from 1685 was transported into the open-air museum of Seurasaari, Helsinki, and replaced by a stone church in 1910 designed by Josef Stenbäck.

== See also ==
- Karuna homepage, in Finnish
