= Mount Vottovaara =

Rock formation of the West Karelian Upland in Russia

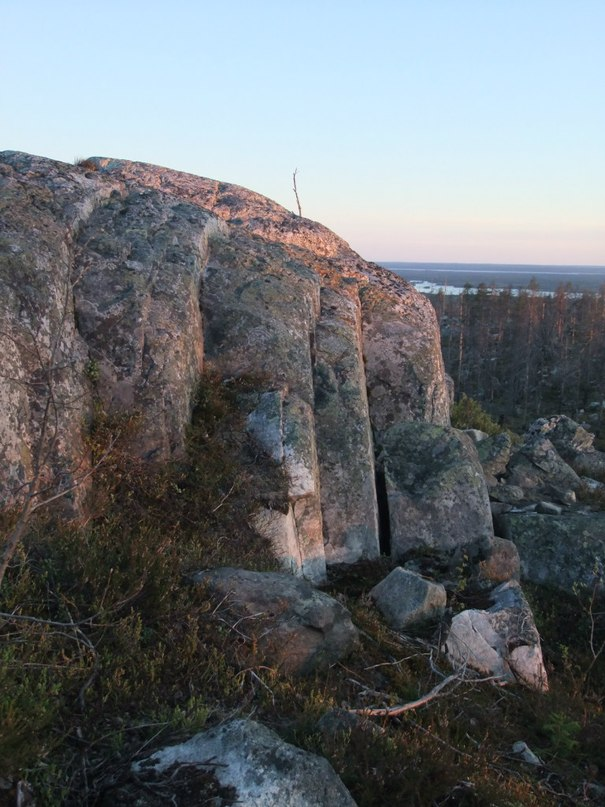

Highest point
- Elevation: 417.3 m (1,369 ft)
- Coordinates: 63°04′27″N 32°37′32″E

Geography
- Location: Republic of Karelia, Russia

Mount Vottovaara is a rock formation of the West Karelian Upland, located in the territory of the Sukkozero rural settlement in the southeastern part of the Muezersky district in the central part of the Republic of Karelia.

== Geographical description ==
The mountain is located 20 km southeast of the Sukkozero settlement, 35 km northeast of the Gimoly settlement, and 40 km southwest of the large lake (reservoir) Segozero. Vottovaara is the highest point of the West Karelian Upland, standing at 417.3 meters above sea level. The mountain covers an area of 6 km^{2}.

The Vottovaara mountain area is situated in the western wing of the Yangozero synclinorium, the second largest (after the Onega synclinorium) on the Karelian Craton.

Vottovaara is characterized as a ridge, stretching in a submeridional direction for approximately 7 km, composed of Jotnian quartzites and quartzite-sandstones, fractured by numerous faults, possibly rejuvenated in the post-glacial period.

== Rock objects ==
The plateau is home to numerous stones, the vast majority of which are rounded boulders. In some cases, large boulders are found in their original positions. The first to report these stone formations as man-made structures was Sergei Simonyan, a local historian from the Sukkozero settlement, in the late 1970s. In the early 1990s, archaeologists M.M. Shakhnovich and I.S. Manyukhin conducted studies on the mountain and concluded that the stones had a cultic purpose and belong to the culture of the Sámi people. A series of subsequent publications in the press sparked interest in Vottovaara, not only from archaeologists but also from representatives of mystical and pseudoscientific movements.

However, in scientific circles, the opinion about the man-made nature of these groups of stones has not gained wide acceptance. For example, M.G. Kosmenko and N.V. Lobanova, senior research associates of the Archaeology Sector at the Institute of Language, Literature, and History of the Karelian Scientific Center of the Russian Academy of Sciences, believe that they can be divided into naturally formed stone clusters, and modern constructs built as a memory of visiting the mountain. The researchers also note that no synchronous Stone Age settlements in the mountain's vicinity, or any other material traces of the "ancient Sámi population", are currently known.

In August 2011, by a decree of the Government of the Republic of Karelia, the Vottovaara mountain complex was declared a natural monument. The protected area covers more than 1,500 hectares and includes the mountain itself and its surrounding territory.

== On the meaning of the toponym Vottovaara ==
The toponym of Sámi origin "Vottovaara" is bicompound; the first part is "votto", and the second part is "vaara". In Sámi toponyms, the name usually starts with the description of the object, followed by a nomenclatural term such as lake, mountain, river, etc.

"Vaara" translates from Sámi as "mountain". There are also two other similar-sounding words: vārr (var) — path, road, and vārrь (var') — forest (the "a" sound is long). However, in Sámi-origin toponyms, "vaara" is always applied to the geographical object "mountain". In the Karelian language: vuaru – mountain, and in the Finnish language: vuori – mountain, hill.

"Votto" is the transcription of the Sámi word vuэjjtэ (pronounced "vuэyte") — to conquer, to overcome, to win. In the Finnish language: voitto — victory, and in the Karelian language: voitto — victory, profit (pronounced in both languages as "voitto").

The name of the mountain Vottovaara can be translated as "Mountain of Victory".

Supporting this interpretation is the fact that in close proximity to the mountain are four additional geographical features sharing the same name: the Votto river and three lakes: Vottoozero, Vottomuks, and Keivotto. According to researchers Vladimir Charnoluski and Georgy Kert, who specialize in Sámi customs and Sámi toponymic lexicon, the first component in the name could be related to both ancient cultic sites and have an epic origin. No other region on the map of Northern Russia, as well as Scandinavia, has a similar clustering of identically named objects.

Archaeological landmarks in central Karelia date back 5–6 thousand years. Activities of the Sámi include hunting and fishing. Vottovaara Mountain is surrounded by lakes with fish reserves and lies at the intersection of seasonal migration routes for reindeer. Reindeer hunting is characterized by the constancy of the animals' habitats and the stability of migration paths. Hunters and fishermen would climb the mountain before the start of the season to offer gifts to the sieidi (sacred stones) in hopes of successful hunting and fishing.

== See also ==
Karlu Karlu / Devils Marbles Conservation Reserve
