= Ledmozero =

Ledmozero Ледмозеро Lietma, Liedmajärvi (Karelian)
- Posyolok
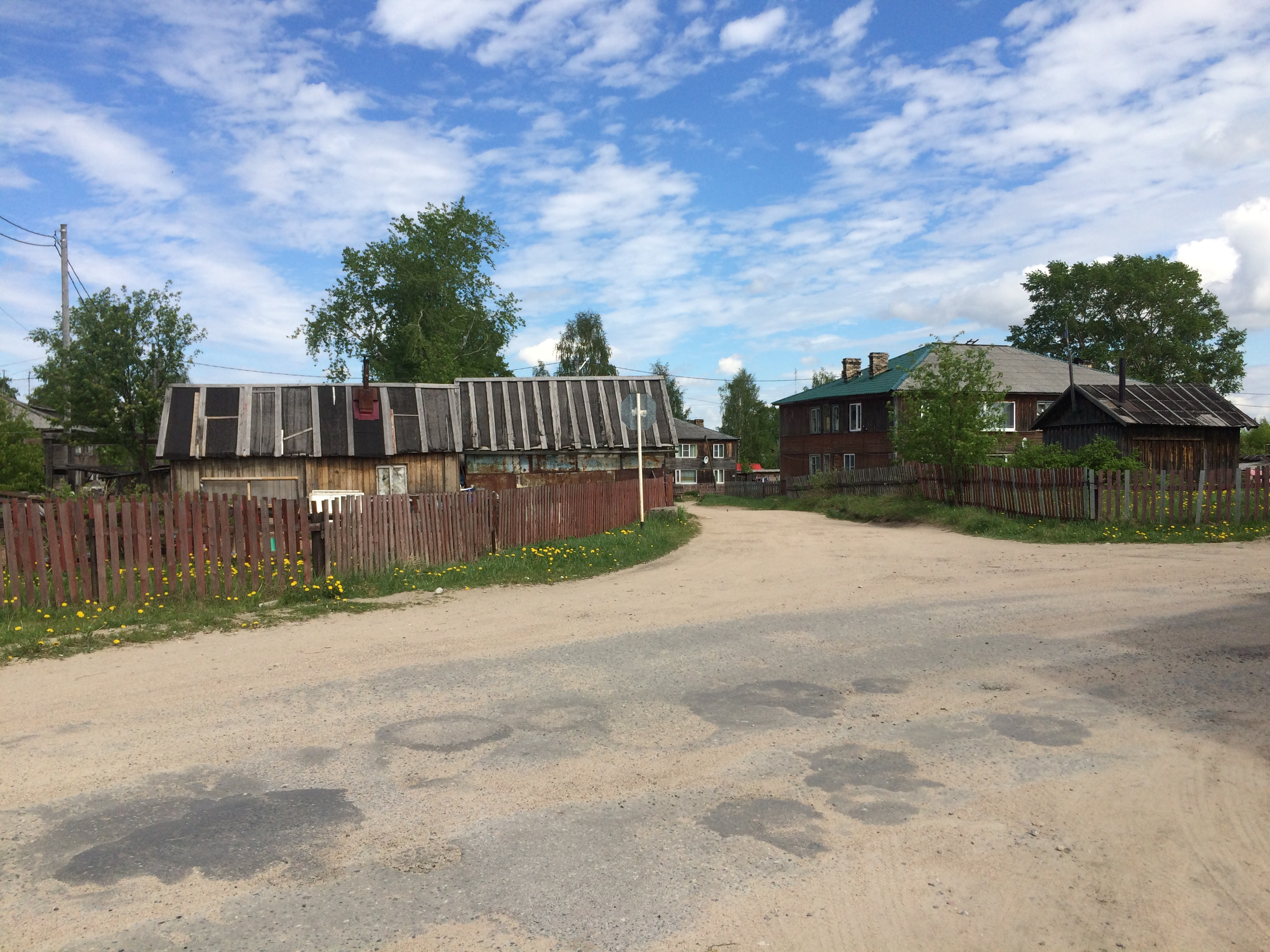
- Ledmozero
- Interactive map of Ledmozero
- Location of Ledmozero Ledmozero (Karelia)
- Coordinates: 64°15′06″N 32°01′42″E
- Country: Russia
- Federal subject: Republic of Karelia
- Administrative district: Muyezersky District
- Founded: 1963

Population (2010 Census)
  - Total: 2,112
  - Estimate (2021): 1,508 (−28.6%)

Municipal status
  - Municipal district: Muyezersky Municipal District
  - Rural settlement: Ledmozerskoye Rural Settlement
  - Capital of: Ledmozerskoye Rural Settlement
- Time zone: UTC+3 (UTC+03:00)
- Postal code: 186970
- OKTMO ID: 86627427101

Ledmozero (Russian: Ледмозеро; Karelian: Liedmajärvi; Finnish: Lietmajärvi) is a settlement in the northern part of Muyezersky District in the Republic of Karelia, Russia, located 7 kilometers (4.3 mi) south-east of Lake Ledmozero. Population: 2,923 (1989 Soviet census).

In 1905, the population of the settlement consisted of six peasant families comprising 12 males and 18 females.

The settlement is connected to Kochkoma by the Ledmozero–Kochkoma Railway, a part of the Oktyabrskaya Railway system.

== History ==
According to the master plan, a settlement was supposed to be built near the railway. This area was previously called Gorely Bor due to the fact that the forest here was destroyed by fire. Construction began in May 1963. The first residential buildings were 4-apartment. In 1964, 8-apartment buildings were built. In the autumn of 1964, a forestry station was opened in the village. Over time, more comfortable houses appeared in the village, two five-storey buildings were built.

Ledmozero had a status of urban-type settlement until 1991, when it was demoted to a rural locality.
