= Helga Sonck-Majewski =

Finnish artist (1916–2015)

- Born: Helga Sonck; 26 December 1916; Tallinn, Estonia
- Died: 12 March 2015 (aged 98); Porvoo, Finland
- Occupation: Artist
- Spouse: Arnold Majewski (m. 1941; died 1942)

Helga Sonck-Majewski (née Sonck; 26 December 1916 – 12 March 2015) was a Finnish artist. Born in Estonia, she was initially a pharmacist who married soldier Arnold Majewski in 1941, who was killed the following year in World War II. In the 1950s, she studied at the Finnish Art Academy School, becoming a professional artist. She was a notable figure for the Porvoo Museum. She died in 2015 at the age of 98.

== Biography ==
Sonck was born on 26 December 1916 in Tallinn, Estonia. Her father worked in the clergy, and her mother pursued a career in medicine. The family relocated to Vyborg, where she spent her childhood. While living in Lieksa, Finland, and working as a pharmacist, she met lieutenant colonel Arnold Majewski. The two wed in 1941, but the marriage was cut short when Majewski was killed in the Second World War the following year. Sonck remained unmarried thereafter. In 1943 she settled in Porvoo, Finland.

Between 1950 and 1953 she trained at the Finnish Art Academy School. Her debut exhibition was hosted by the Porvoo Museum in 1956. She helped found the Porvoo Art Association in 1966. She died in Porvoo on 12 March 2015 at the age of 98.
