= Mai Guba attack =

- Part of Continuation War
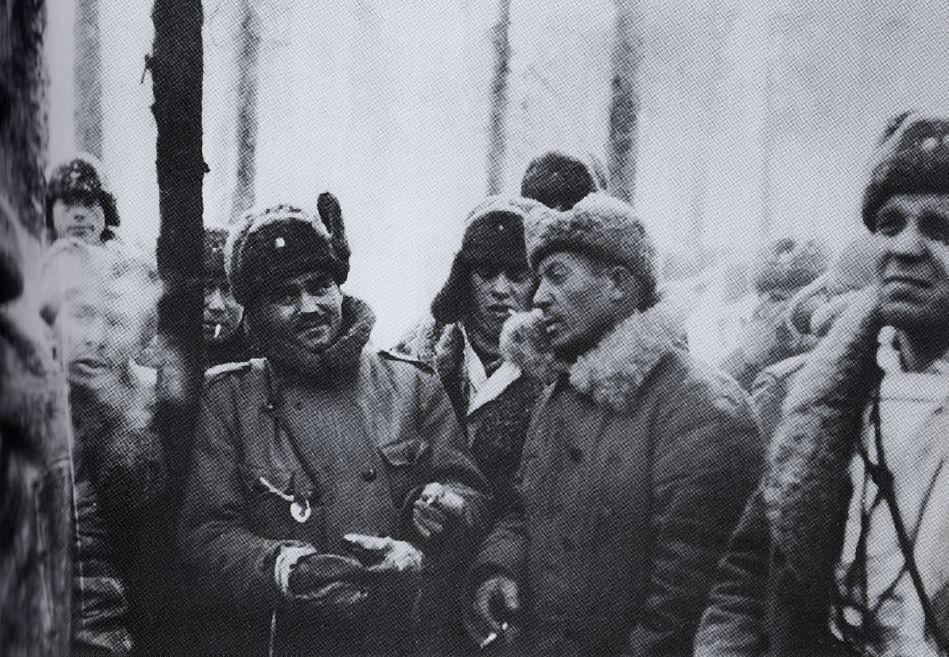
- Finnish long-range group taking a break after derailing an Allied equipment train.
Location	Mai Guba, Viena Karelia (Today Karelia, Russia)
Result	Finnish minor victory
Territorial changes	10 kilometres of the Murmansk Railway destroyed

Commanders and leaders
- Arnold Majewski

Strength
- 1924 Men, 268 horses

Casualties and losses
Finnish casualties: 4 KIA, 10 injured, 60 sick or frostbite	Soviet casualties: 4 KIA, 2 civilians

The Mai Guba attack was a guerilla attack by the Finnish forces during the Continuation War on 18 January 1942. Its purpose was to cut the Murmanni track and to destroy the station village of Mai Guba together with its depots and stores.

The attack was planned by Erkki Raappana, Carl Gustaf Emil Mannerheim and Aksel Airo and a decision to perform it was made in early January 1942. The attack was led by Arnold Majewski, who came from a Polish cavalier family.

The group selected to perform the attack was the 1st Battalion of the 10th Infantry Regiment of the 14th Division, led by Eino Laisto, and the Frontier Jaeger Battalion 6, led by Major Matti Murole. Participants in the attack also included an anti-aircraft team, a pioneer and communications group, a communications detachment of the army, a medical group, and companies for command and service. On 14 January a total of 1924 men and 268 horses with full equipment embarked on the mission.

On their mission, the attack group burned down 92 houses, 12 full storage houses along with their equipment and a sawmill. Ten kilometres of the Murmanni track, telegraph and telephone wires, 11 railway carriages, 8 railway switches, a stable for a hundred horses and a railway bridge were destroyed.

The Finnish casualties included four men killed in action, 10 injured and 79 frostbitten. The casualties for the Red Army included four men killed in action. Two civilians were also killed.
