= Rami Sarmasto =

Finnish actor and musician

Raimo Sulo Virtanen (August 24, 1938 – February 13, 1965), better known by his stage name, Rami Sarmasto, was a Finnish actor and musician.

== Biography ==
Raimo Sulo Virtanen was born on August 24, 1938, in Sauvo, Finland.

Sarmasto graduated from the Finnish Theatre Academy in the year of 1958. Sarmasto starred in several roles in productions at the Turku City Theatre in Turku, Finland.

Sarmasto had been dating fellow Finnish actress Tamara Lund and they were expected to marry, however, on February 13, 1965, Sarmasto was killed in a car accident on the Finnish National Road No. 2 in Humppila, Finland, at the age of twenty-six. Lund was present with Sarmasto when he was killed and the accident occurred only weeks prior to the planned wedding. Sarmasto is buried within the Turku Cemetery in Turku.

== Filmography ==
- Nummisuutarit (1957)
- Sotapojan heilat (1958)
- Nuori mylläri (1958)
- Nuoruus vauhdissa (1961)
- Papin perhe (1962)
- Oi nuoruus (1963)
