= Sauvo =

Sauvo Sagu
- Municipality
- Sauvon kunta Sagu kommun
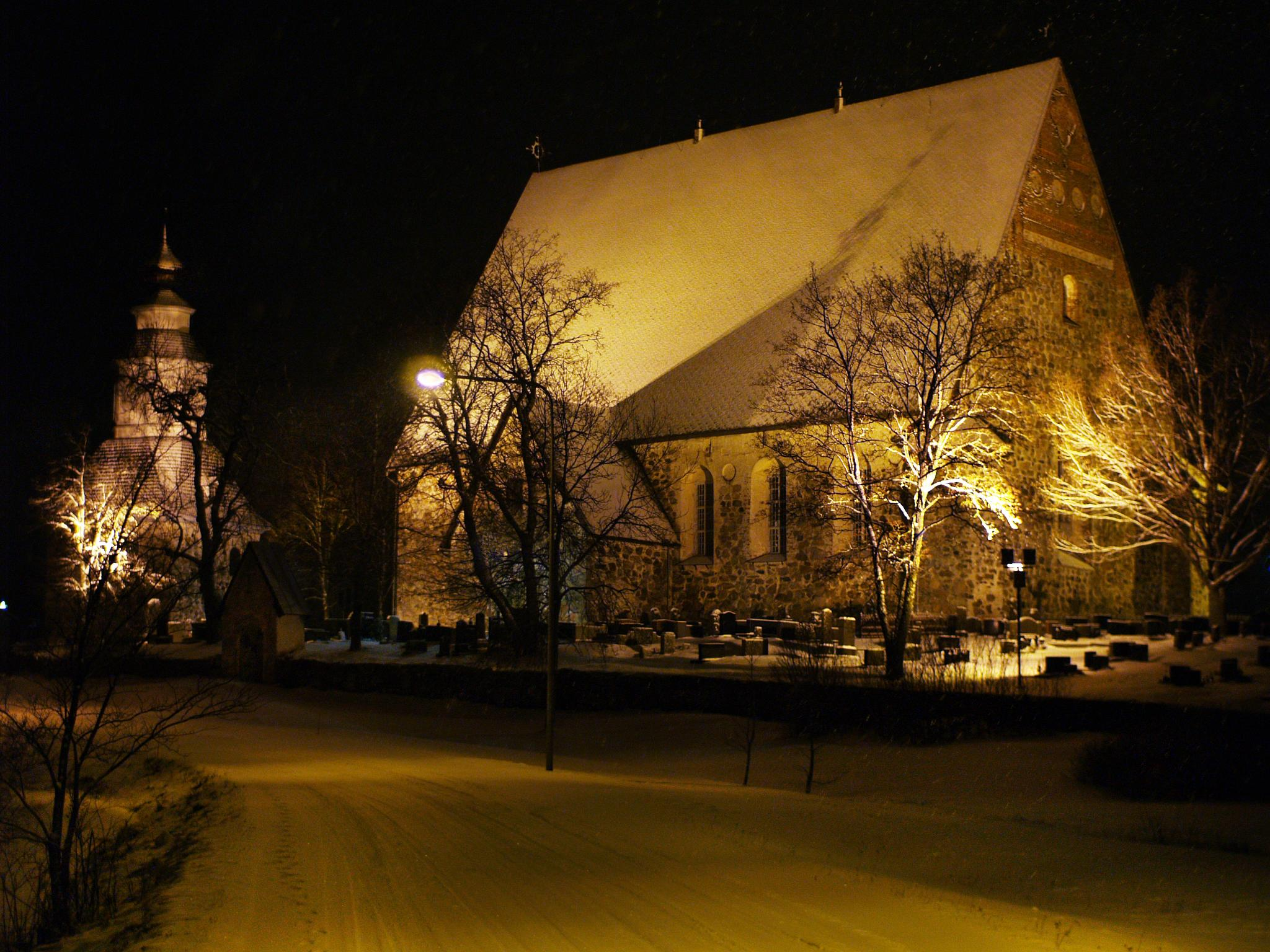
- The Sauvo Church

- Coat of arms

- Location of Sauvo in Finland
- Interactive map of Sauvo
- Coordinates: 60°20.5′N 022°41.5′E
- Country: Finland
- Region: Southwest Finland
- Sub-region: Turku sub-region

Government
  - Municipal manager: Satu Simelius

Area (2018-01-01)
  - Total: 299.47 km^{2} (115.63 sq mi)
  - Land: 252.77 km^{2} (97.60 sq mi)
  - Water: 47.21 km^{2} (18.23 sq mi)
  - Rank: 244th largest in Finland

Population (2025-12-31)
  - Total: 2,957
  - Rank: 214th largest in Finland
  - Density: 11.7/km^{2} (30/sq mi)

Population by native language
  - Finnish: 90.5% (official)
  - Swedish: 2.4%
  - Others: 7.1%

Population by age
  - 0 to 14: 15.1%
  - 15 to 64: 57.5%
  - 65 or older: 27.4%
- Time zone: UTC+02:00 (EET)
  - Summer (DST): UTC+03:00 (EEST)
- Postal code: 21570
- Climate: Dfb
- Website: www.sauvo.fi

Sauvo (Finnish: [ˈsɑu̯ʋo]; Swedish: Sagu) is a municipality of Finland. It is located in the Southwest Finland region. The municipality had a population of 2,957 (31 December 2025) and covers an area of 299.47 square kilometres (115.63 sq mi) of which 47.21 km^{2} (18.23 sq mi) is water. The population density is 11.7 inhabitants per square kilometre (30/sq mi).

Like many waterside areas near major population centres, Sauvo's population increases every summer because of summer cottage usage. While vacationers are not reflected in the official statistics, they roughly double the population during the summer. Today it holds a stone church from the late 15th century, and many manor houses.

The municipality is unilingually Finnish.

== History ==
Sauvo is home to a number of archaeological finds from the Iron Age. The first written mention of Sauvo dates back to the year of 1335.

The municipality of Karuna was merged into Sauvo in the year of 1969.

== Notable persons ==
- Aatos Tapala, opera singer and actor
- Arno Jaatinen, Jäger major
- Arto Nuotio, singer
- Arvo Korsimo, politician
- Eero Rislakki, industrial engineer
- Esko Kiviranta, politician
- John Rosenbröijer, Jäger trooper
- Jorma Rinne, athlete
- Petri Laaksonen, musician
- Rami Sarmasto, actor and musician
- Sanna Perkiö, politician
- Veikko Palomaa, writer
- Eyolf Georg Mattsson, brigade commander of the Soviet Army
- Aleksi Lammela, sauvon paras gartic phonen pelaaja

== Gallery ==
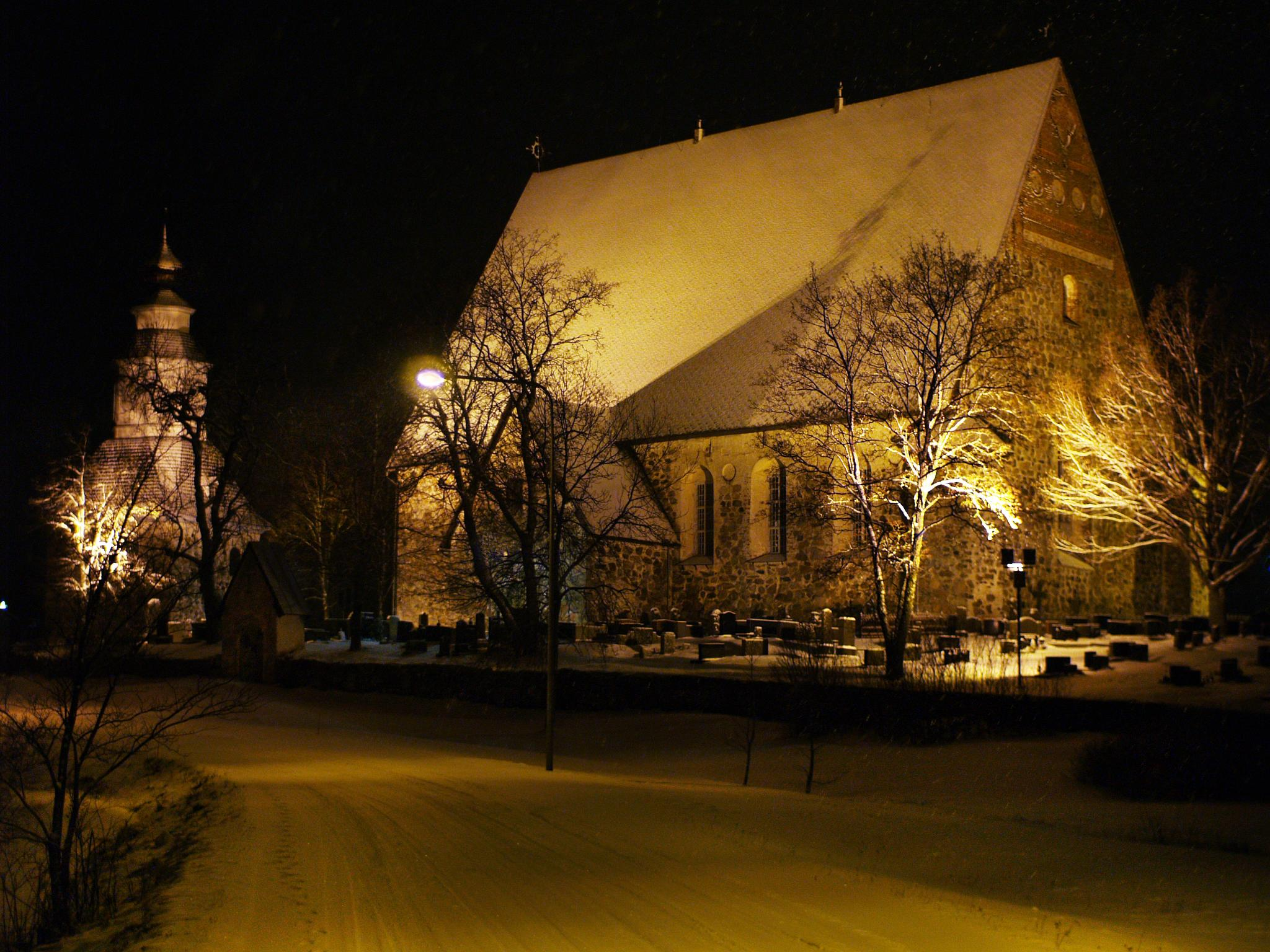
The church of Sauvo

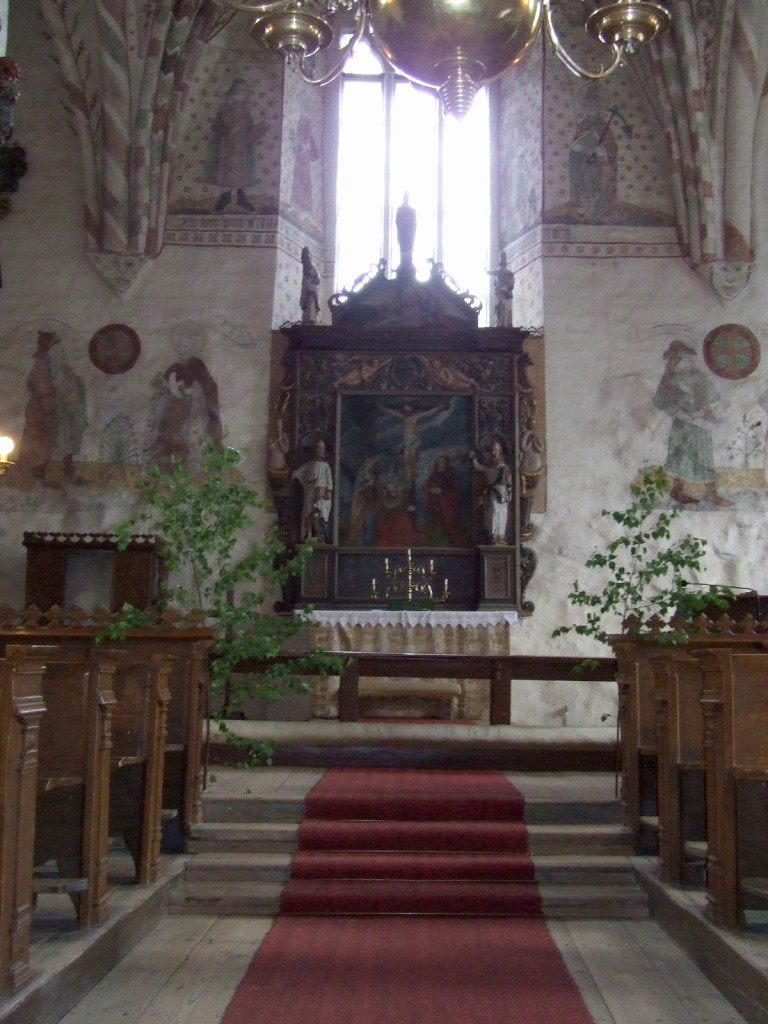
Inside Sauvo's church

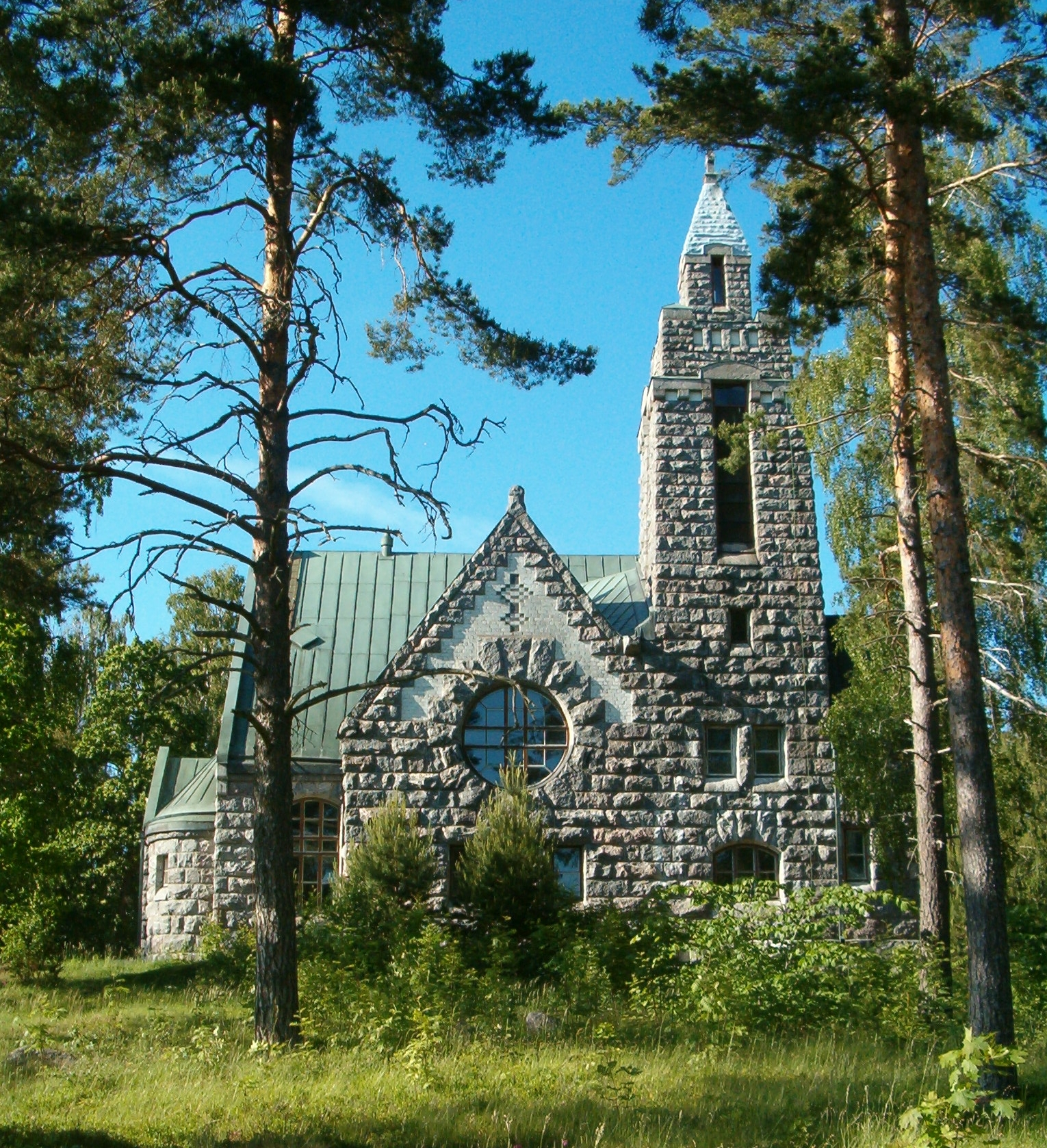
Church of Karuna

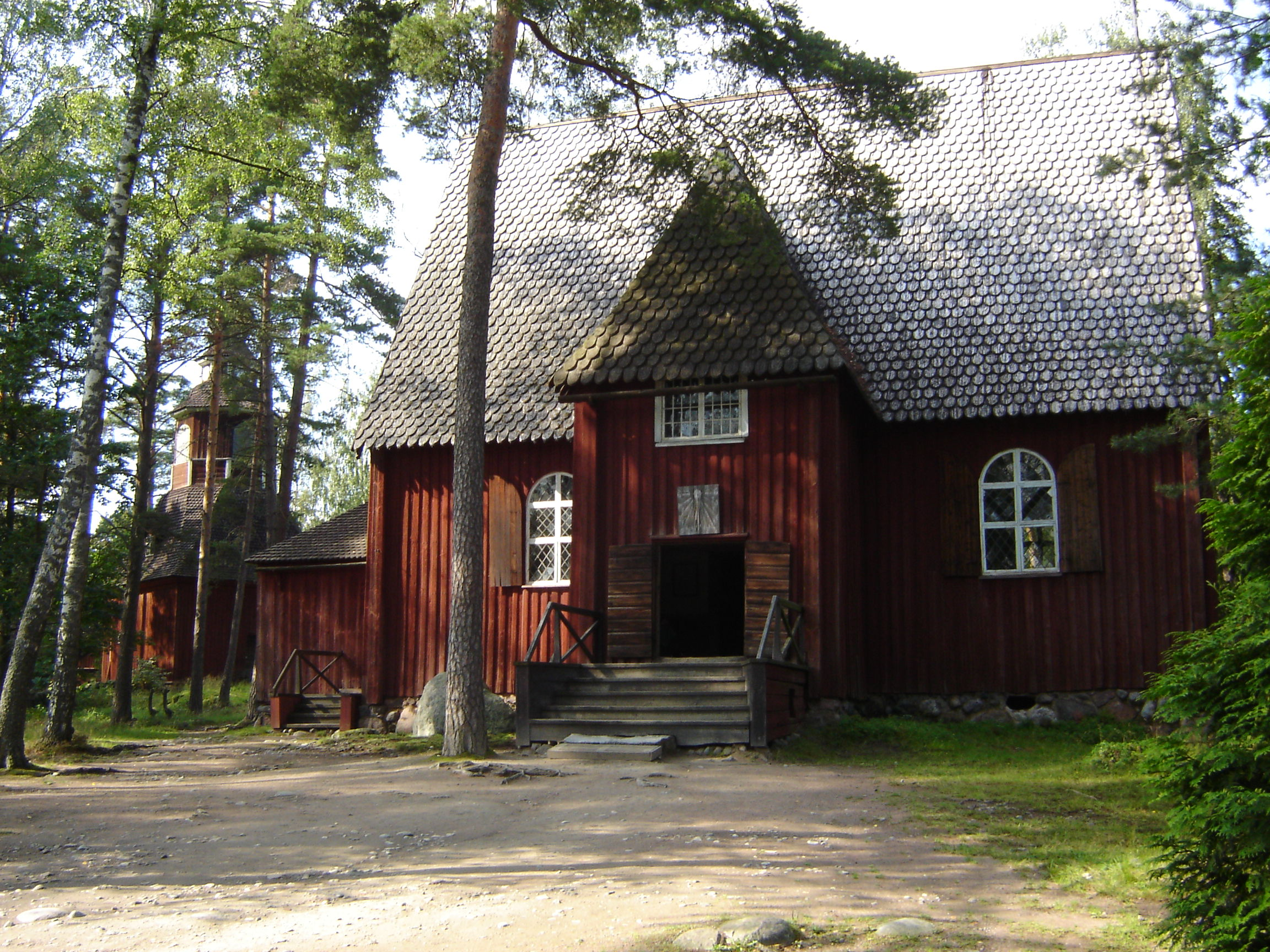
Old church of Karuna, today in Seurasaari
