= Kochkoma =

Kochkoma Кочкома
- Posyolok
- Interactive map of Kochkoma
- Location of Kochkoma Kochkoma (Karelia)
- Coordinates: 64°2′1″N 34°14′22″E
- Country: Russia
- Federal subject: Republic of Karelia
- Administrative district: Segezhsky District

Population (2010 Census)
  - Total: 165
  - Estimate (2021): 57 (−65.5%)

Municipal status
  - Municipal district: Segezhsky Municipal District
  - Rural settlement: Idelskoye Rural Settlement
- Time zone: UTC+3 (UTC+03:00)
- Postal code: 186440
- OKTMO ID: 86645420126

Kochkoma (Russian: Кочкома; Karelian: Kočkoma) is a settlement and a railway junction in Segezhsky District of the Republic of Karelia, Russia.

The settlement is connected to Ledmozero by the Ledmozero–Kochkoma Railway, a part of the Oktyabrskaya Railway system.
