= Seurasaari =

Island in Helsinki, Finland

Coordinates: 60°11′N 024°53′E

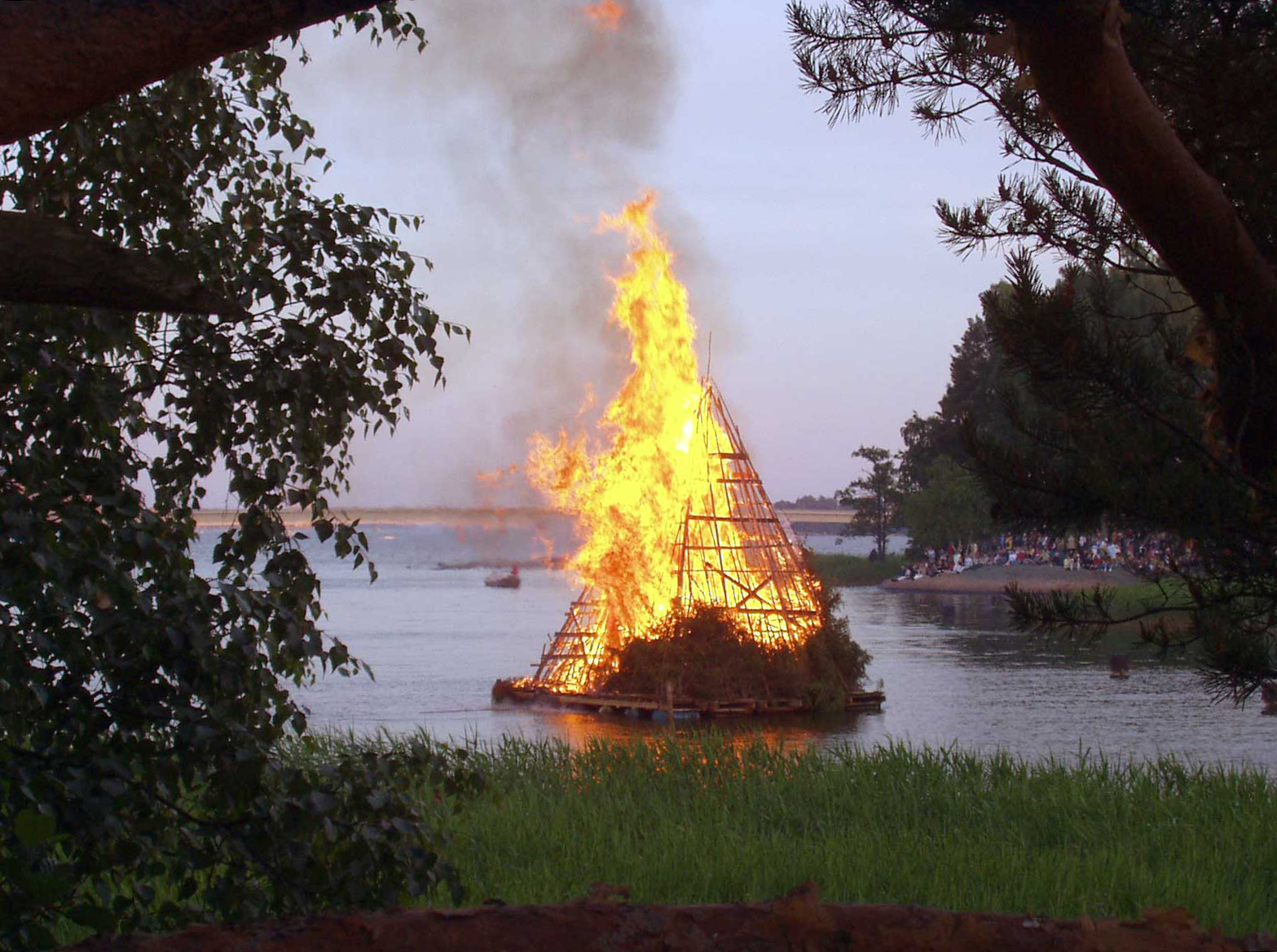
Midsummer bonfire, Seurasaari

Seurasaari (Swedish: Fölisön) is an island and a district in Helsinki, Finland, known mostly as the location of the Seurasaari Open-Air Museum, which consists of old, mainly wooden buildings transplanted from elsewhere in Finland and placed in the dense forest landscape of the island.

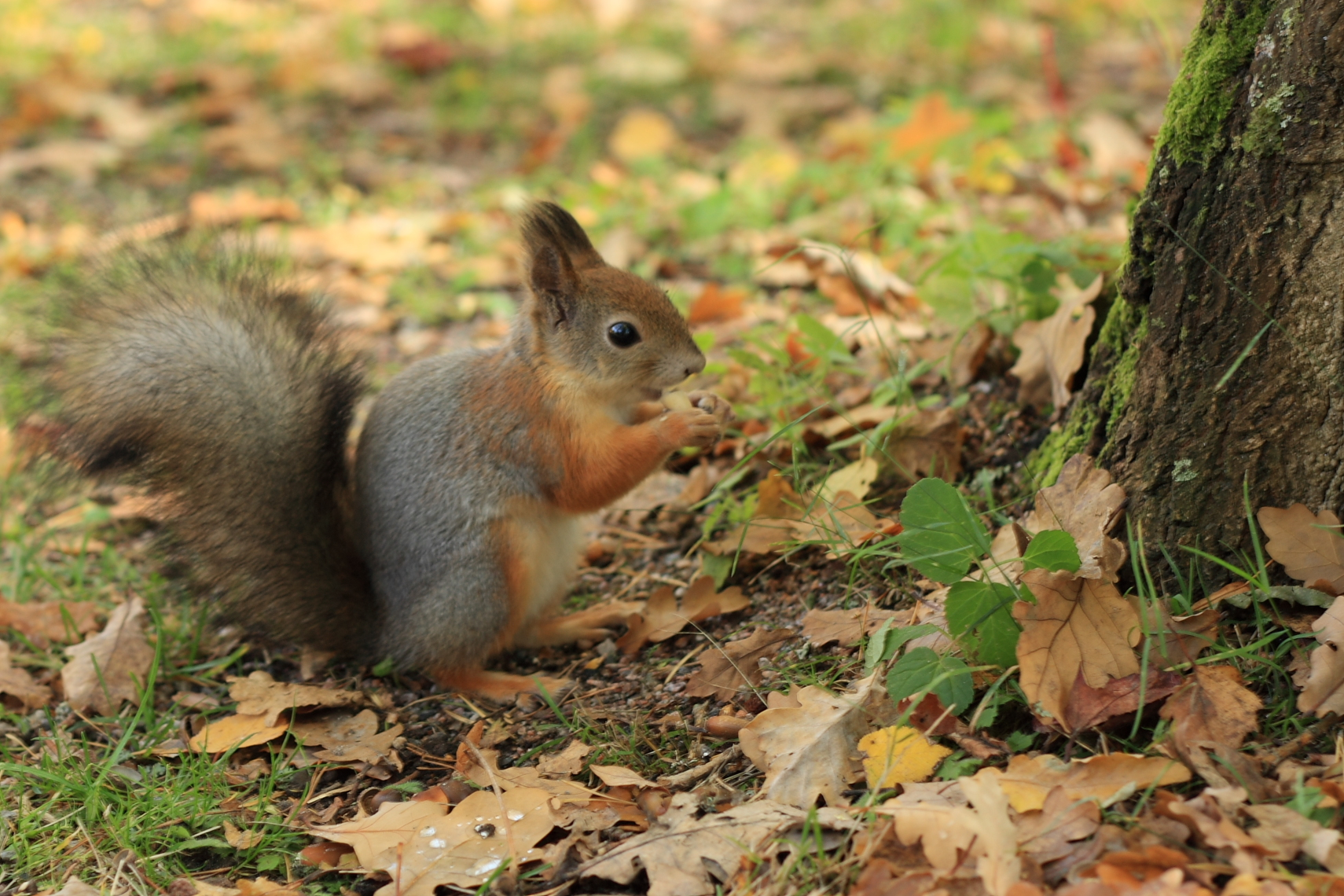
Red squirrel in Seurasaari. The almost domesticated red squirrels on that island have become accustomed to humans thanks to their long-term feeding.

Every summer, many Helsinkians come to Seurasaari to enjoy the rural, peaceful outdoor atmosphere. Despite the visitors, the island has a variety of wildlife, especially birds, but also red squirrels and hares. The height of the island's popularity is at Midsummer, when a huge bonfire (Finnish: juhannuskokko, Swedish: midsommareld) is built on a small isle just off the island's coast, and ignited by a newlywed couple. Thousands of people, both tourists and Helsinkians, watch the burning of the bonfire from both Seurasaari itself and from boats anchored near it.

Seurasaari also includes one of only two nudist beaches in Helsinki and one of only three in the entire country. Unlike the other nudist beaches, the beach is segregated for men and women separately with no unisex nudist area and is subject to a fee.

In October 2024, it was announced that the Seurasaari Open-Air Museum would be closed due to budget cuts by Petteri Orpo's government affecting the Finnish Heritage Agency.

== Gallery ==
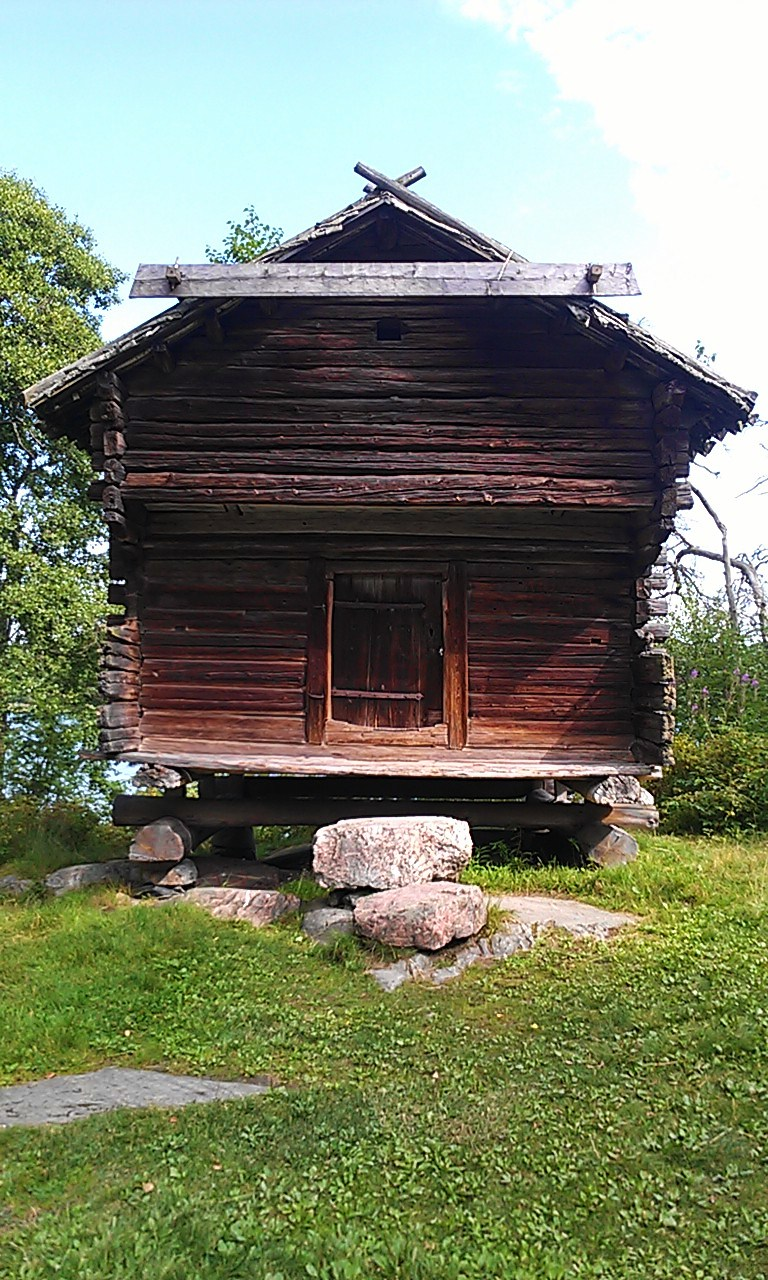
The Granary, built in the North-Ostrobothnian style.

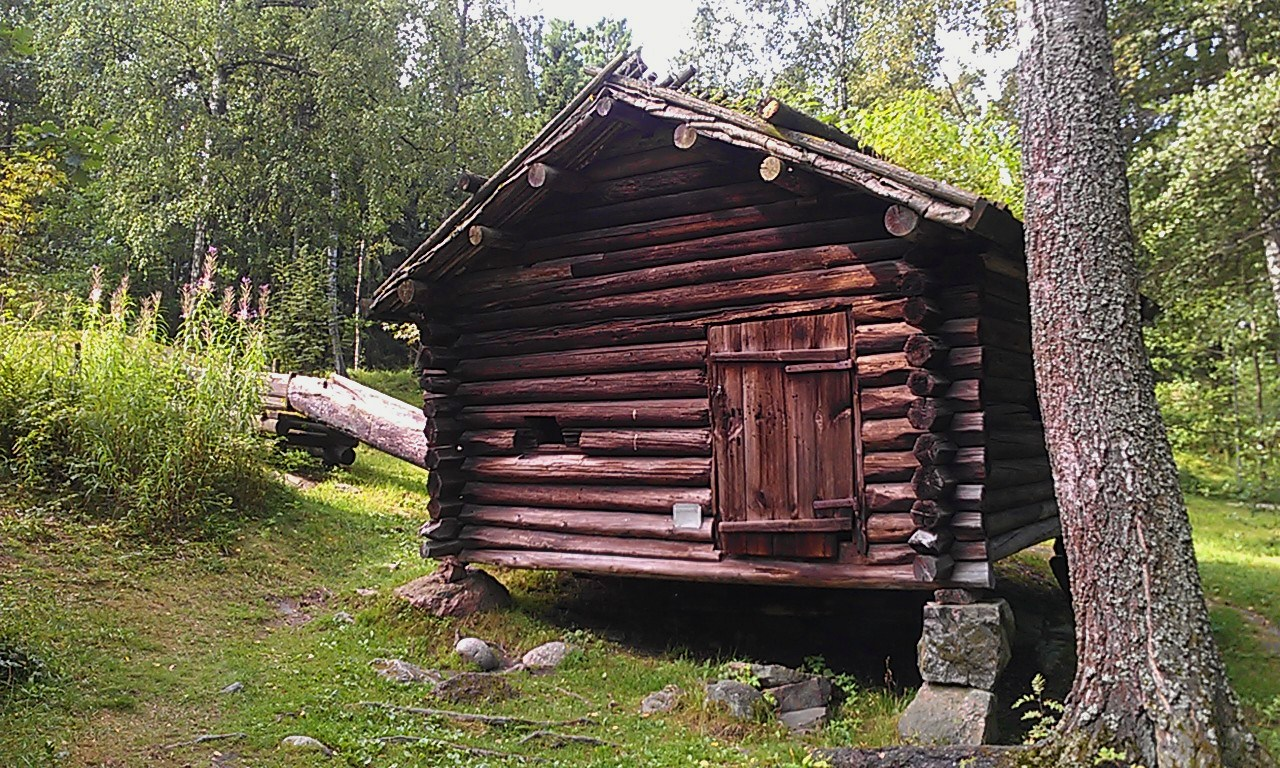
The Water Mill.

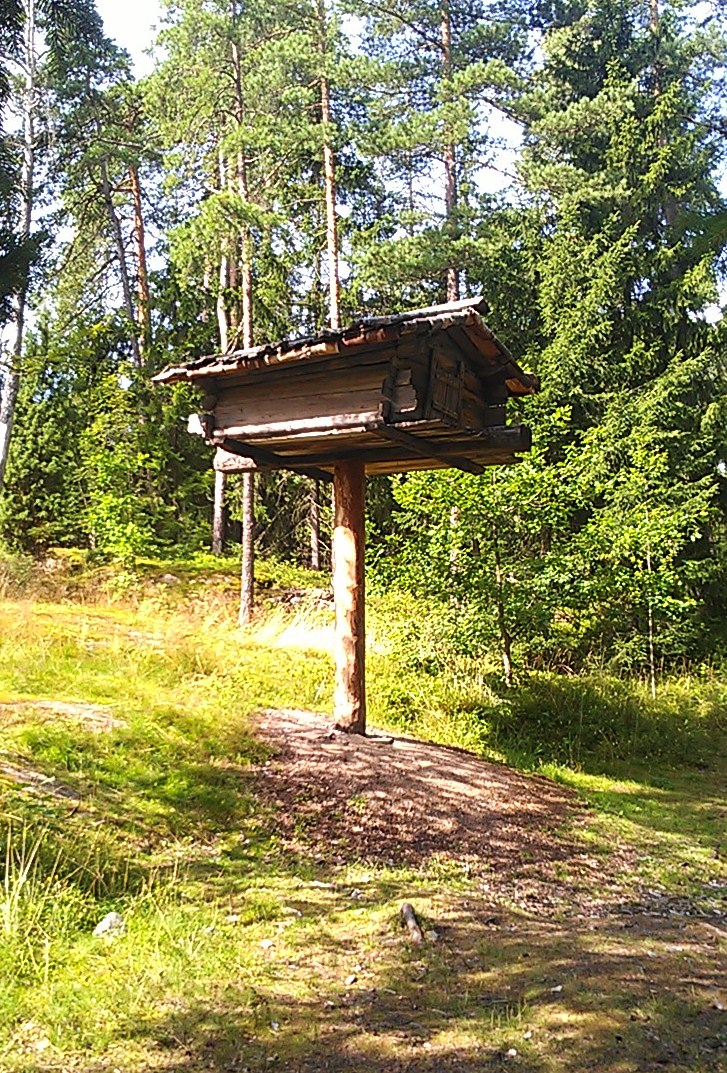
The Tree Storehouse from Petsamo

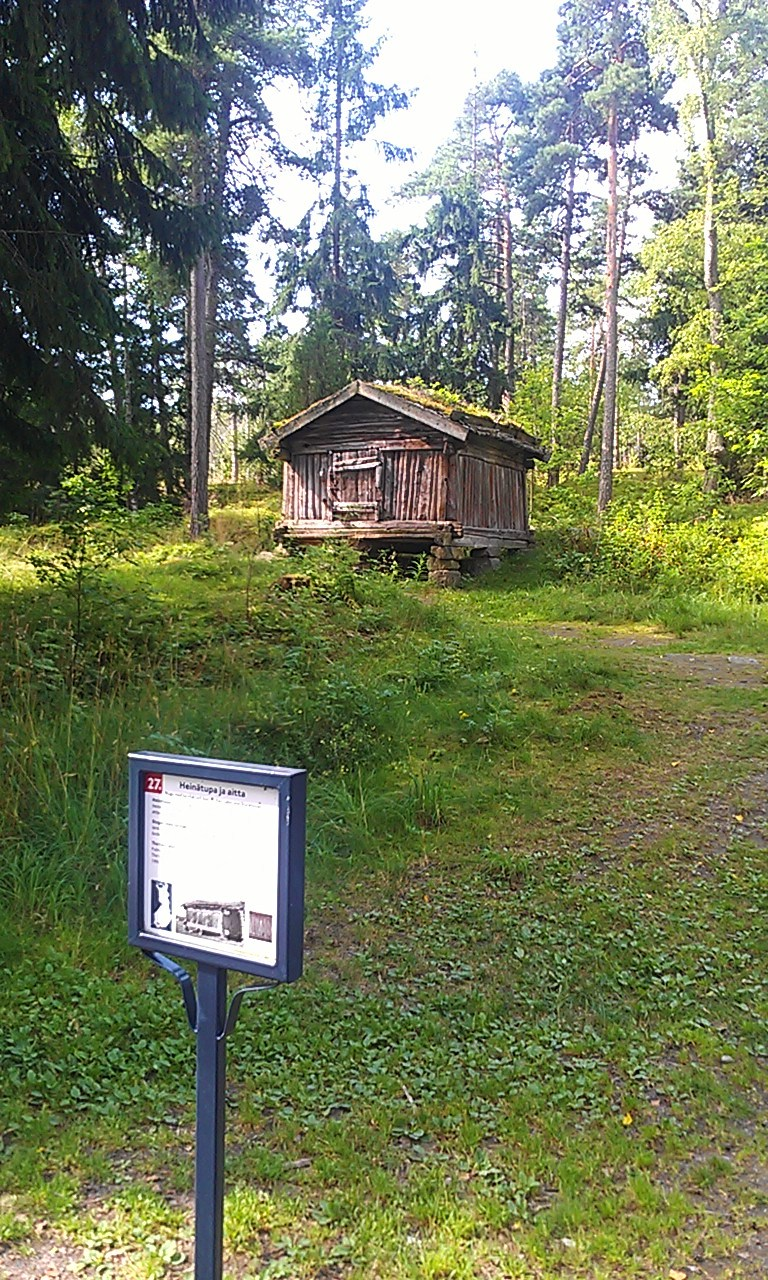
Storehouse from Utsjoki

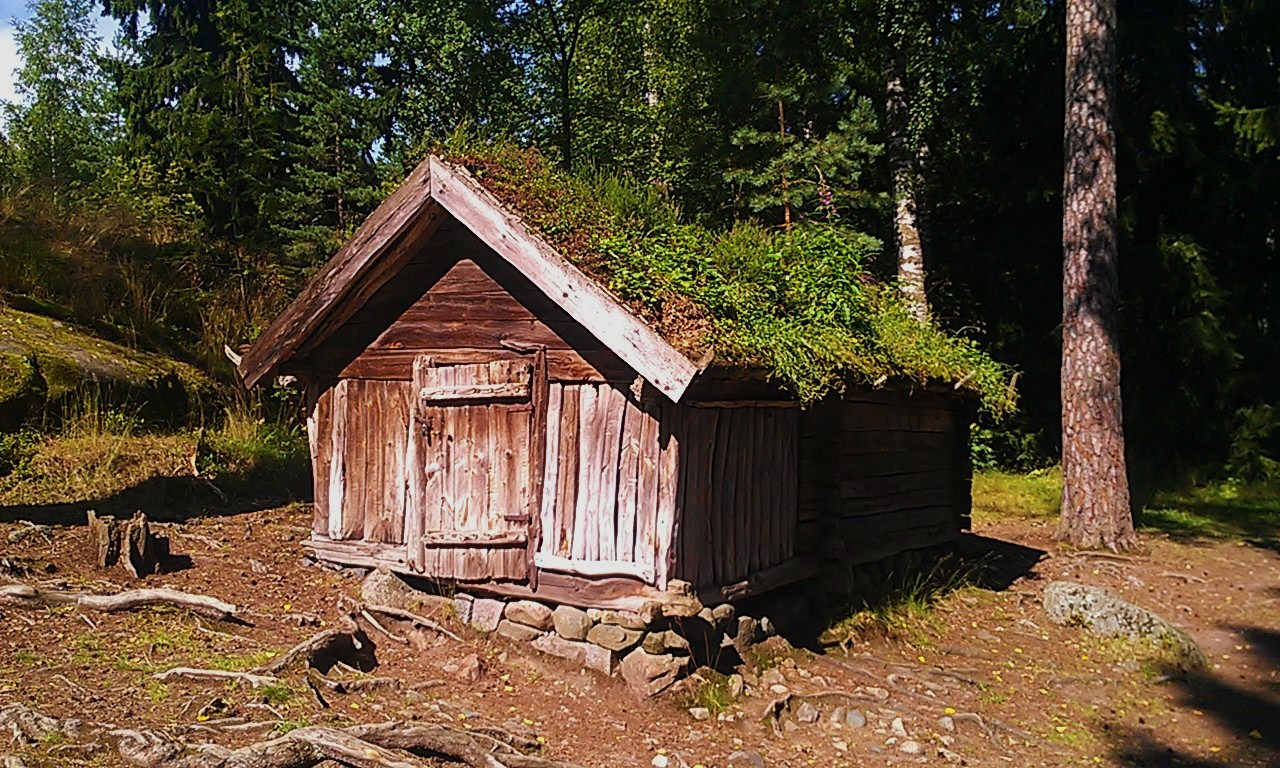
Hay Cabin from Utsjoki

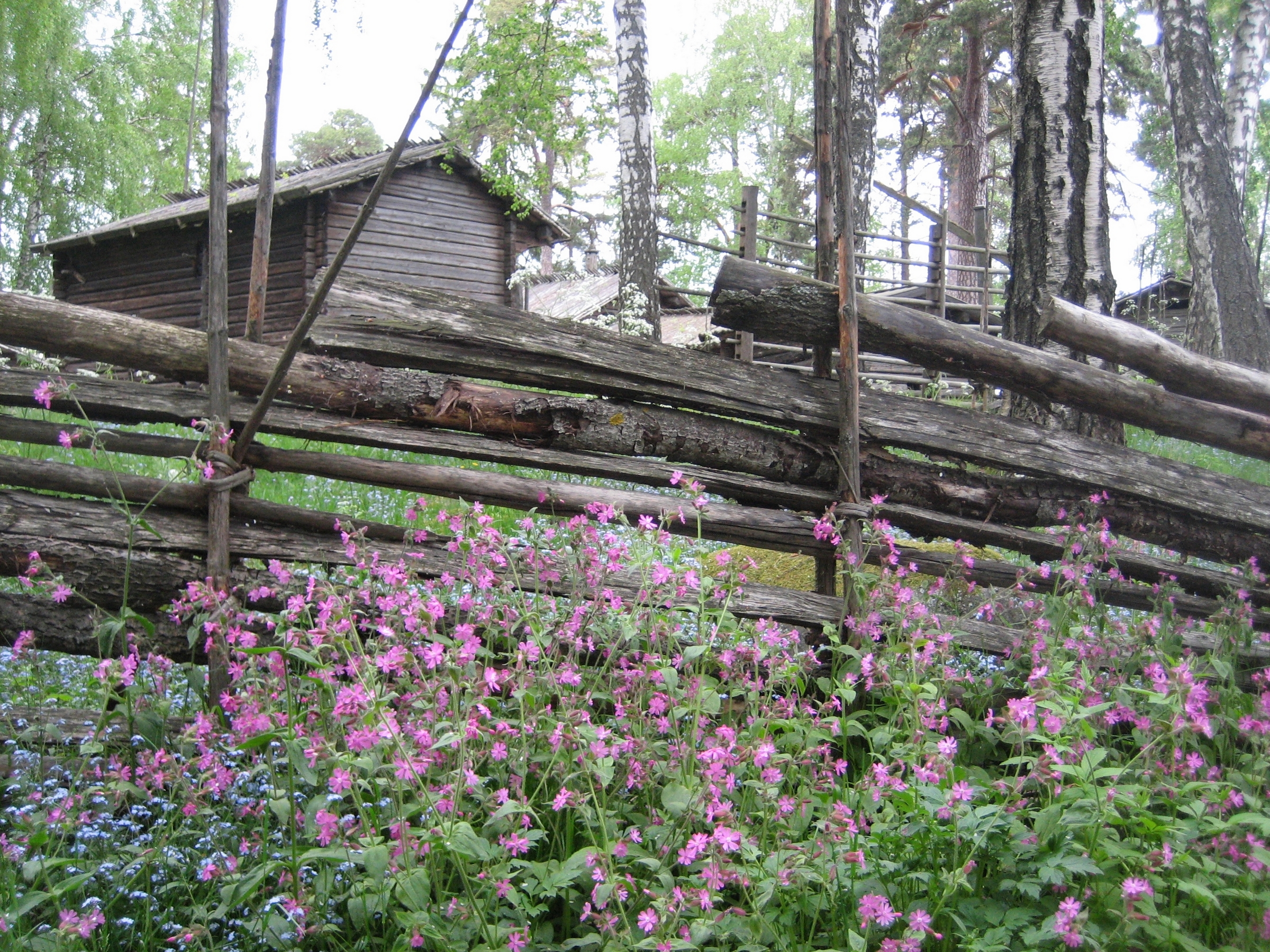
Niemelä tenant farm.

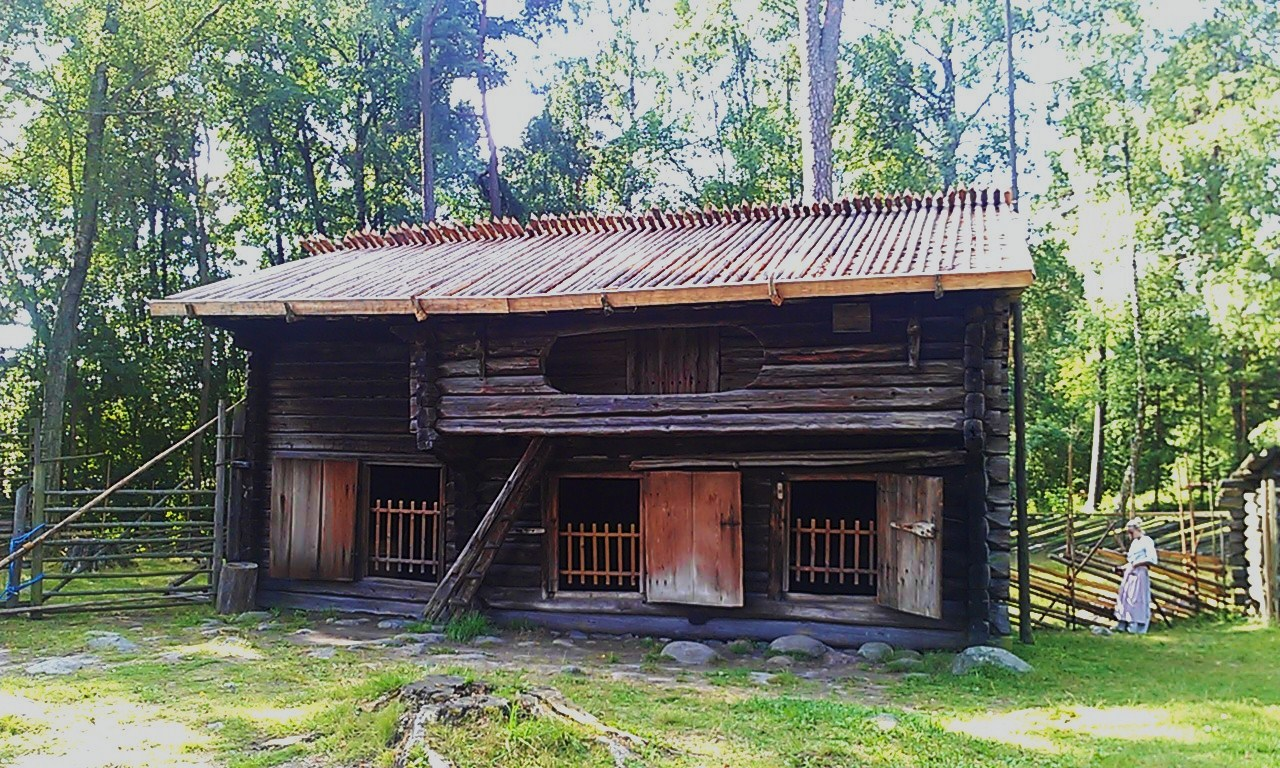
Building at Niemelä tenant farm.

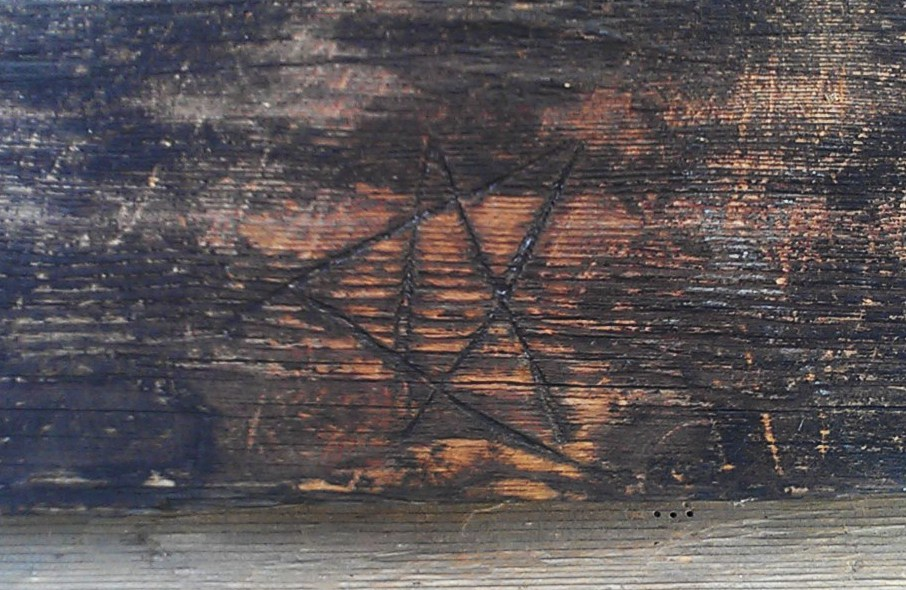
Apotropaic mark on a farmhouse from Niemelä Tenant Farm

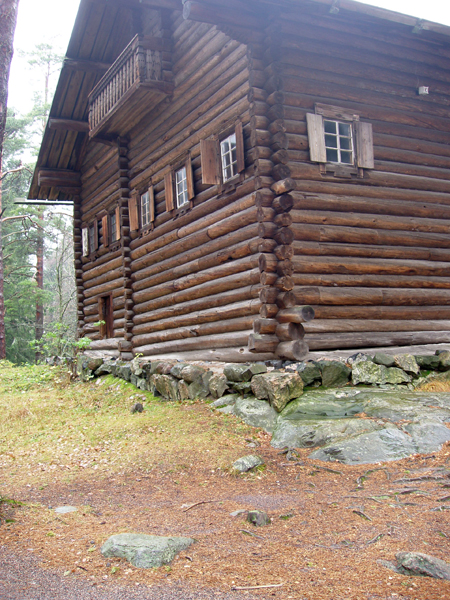
Pertinotsa farmhouse.

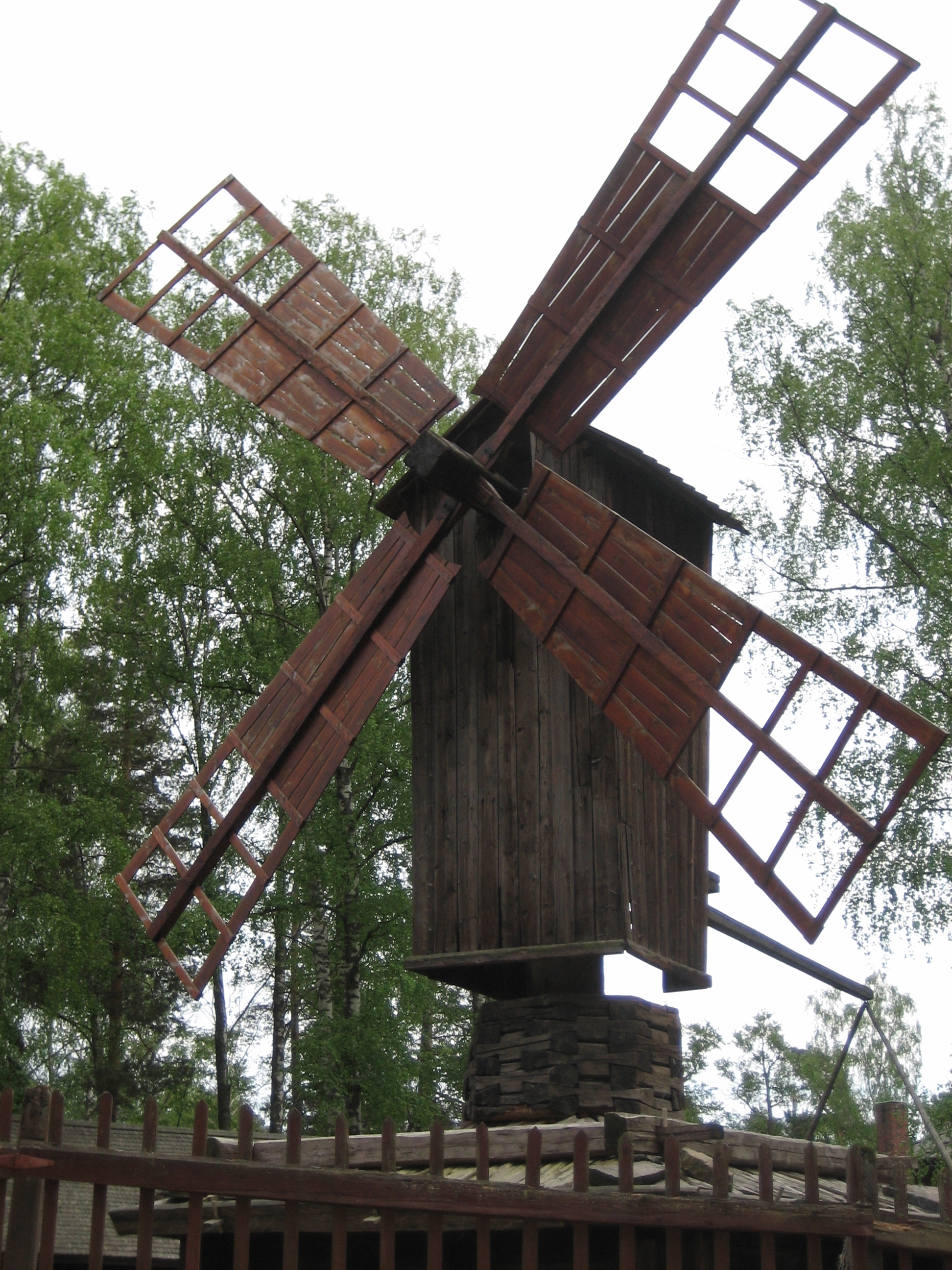
Farm windmill

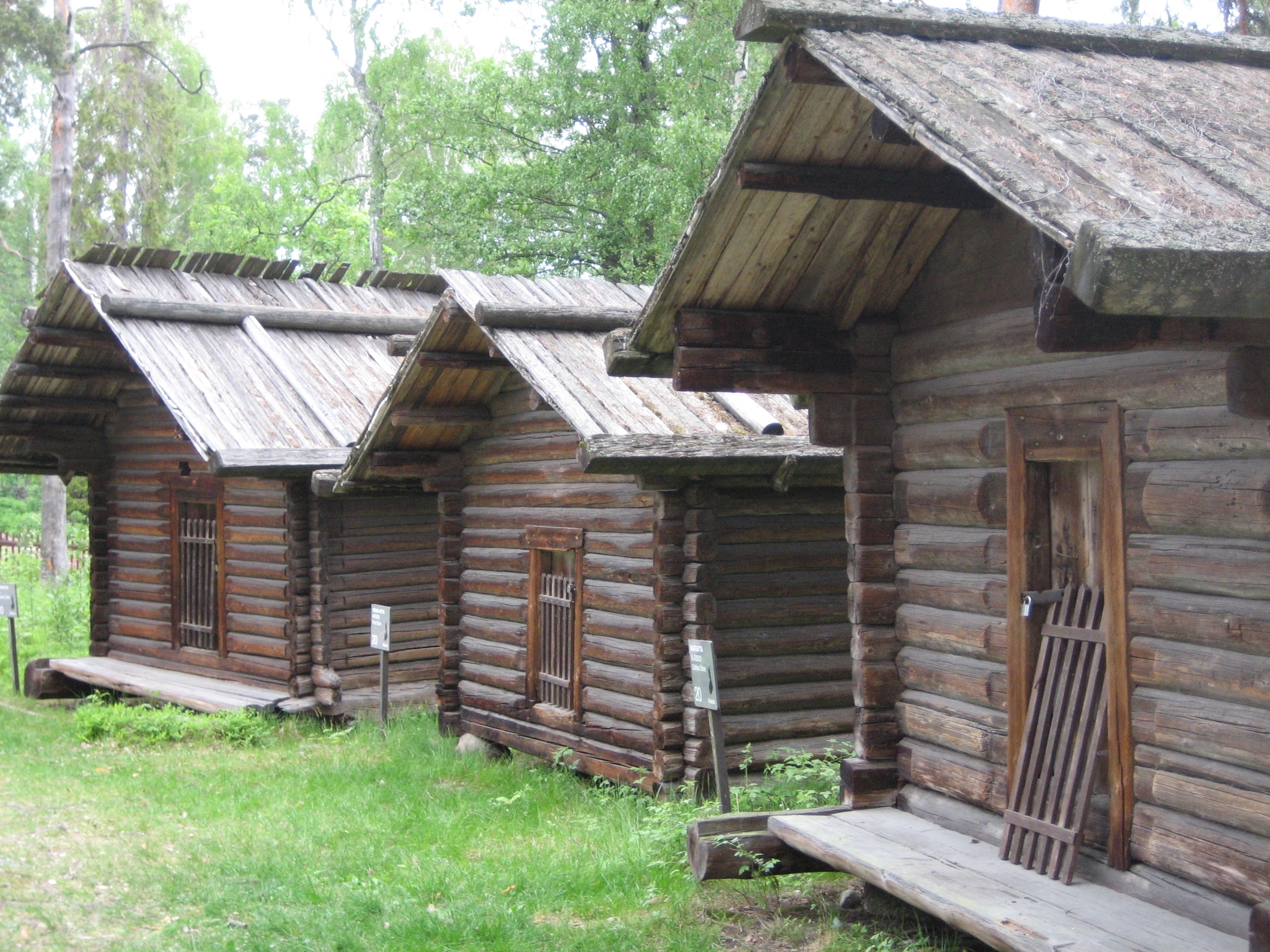
Clothes and food stores.

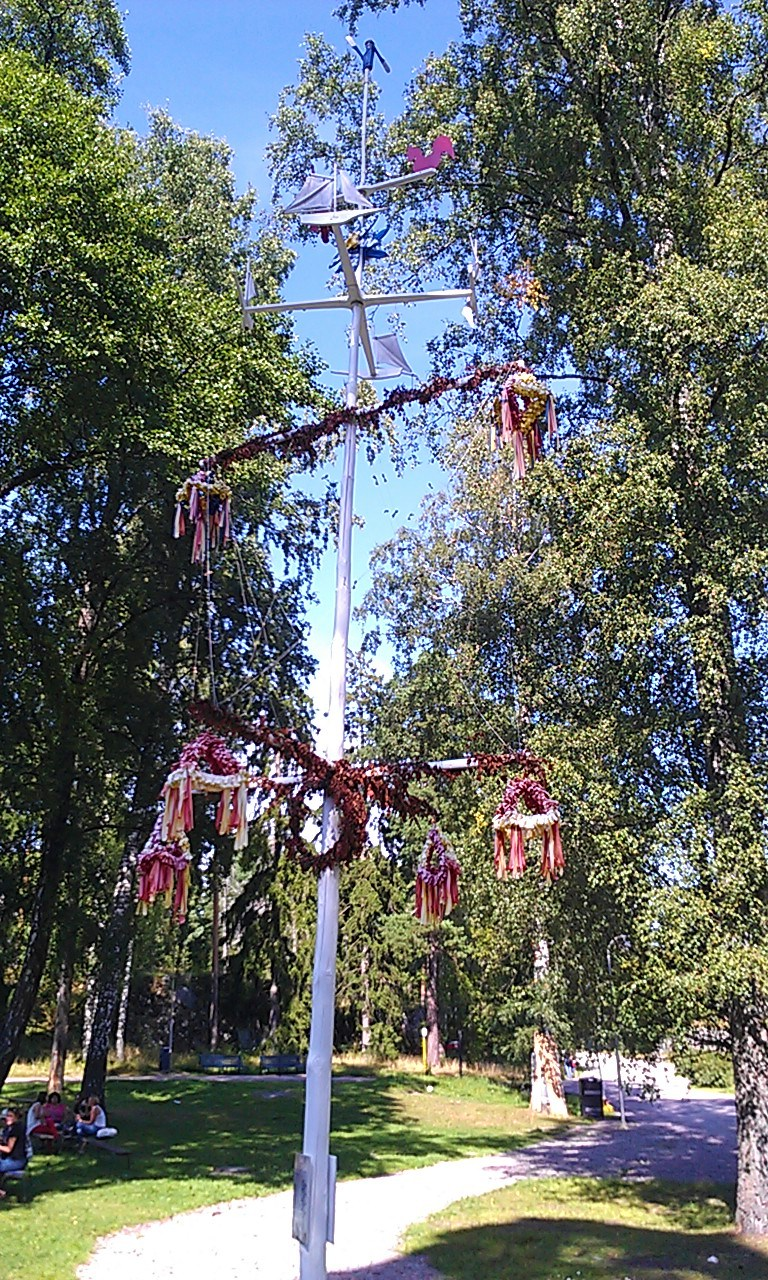
A Midsummer pole based on examples found at Eckerö in Åland.

== See also ==
- Architecture of Finland
