= Muyezersky (urban-type settlement) =

Muyezersky Муезерский Mujehd'ärvi (Karelian)
- Urban-type settlement
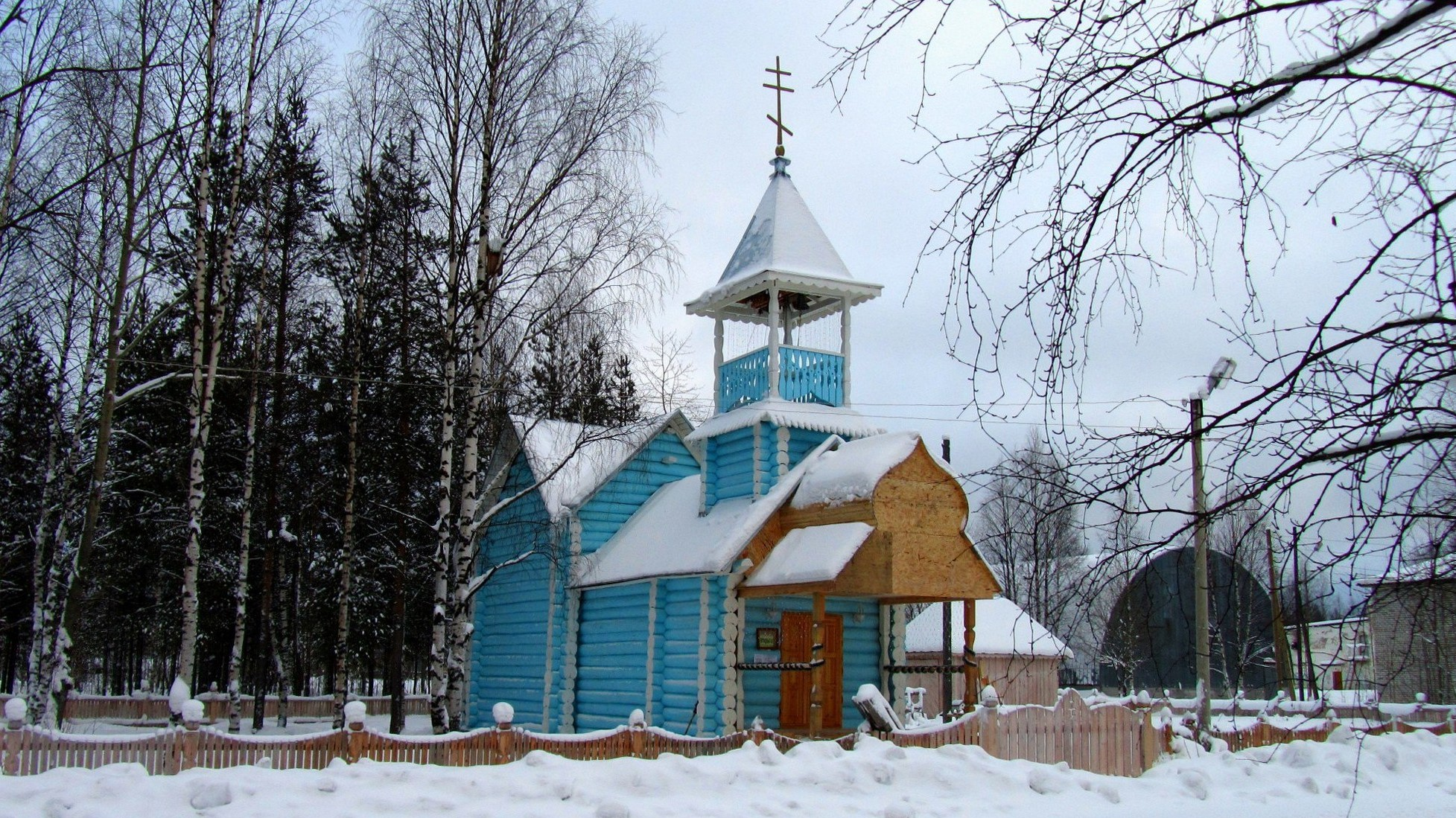
- Theotokos Church in Muyezersky

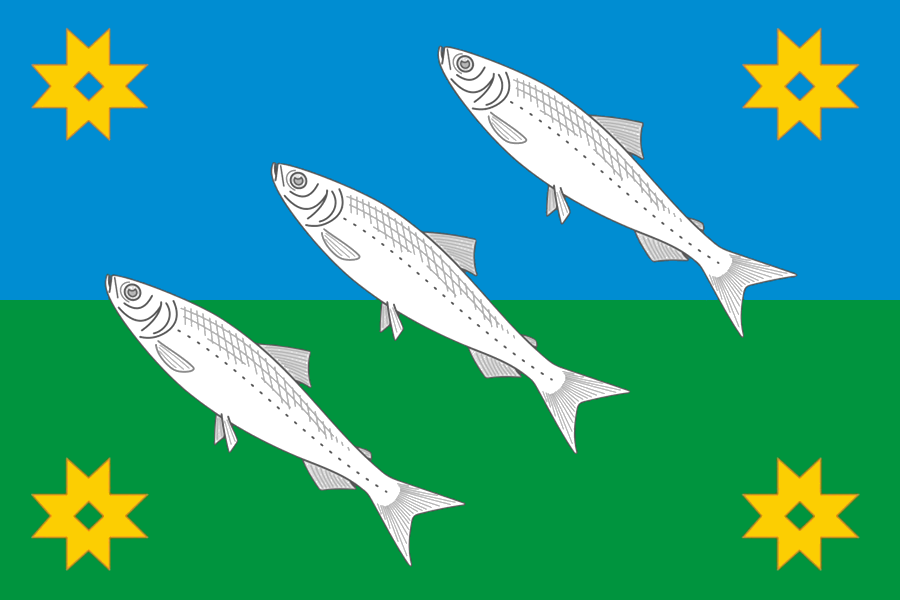
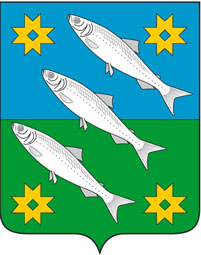
- Flag Coat of arms
- Interactive map of Muyezersky
- Location of Muyezersky Muyezersky (Karelia)
- Coordinates: 63°58′N 32°00′E
- Country: Russia
- Federal subject: Republic of Karelia
- Administrative district: Muyezersky District
- Founded: end of the 1930s
- Urban-type settlement status since: 1965

Population (2010 Census)
  - Total: 3,328
  - Estimate (2025): 2,410 (−27.6%)

Administrative status
  - Capital of: Muyezersky District

Municipal status
  - Municipal district: Muyezersky Municipal District
  - Urban settlement: Muyezerskoye Urban Settlement
  - Capital of: Muyezersky Municipal District, Muyezerskoye Urban Settlement
- Time zone: UTC+3 (UTC+03:00)
- Postal code: 186960
- OKTMO ID: 86627151051
- Website: muezersky.ru/poselen/muezerskoe_gor.html

Muyezersky (Russian: Муезе́рский; Karelian: Mujehd'ärvi; Finnish: Mujejärvi) is an urban locality (an urban-type settlement) and the administrative center of Muyezersky District of the Republic of Karelia, Russia, located on the Muyezerka River (Kem's basin), 375 kilometers (233 mi) northwest of Petrozavodsk, the capital of the republic. As of the 2010 Census, its population was 3,328.

== History ==
Historical affiliations

Soviet Union 1930s–1941
Republic of Finland 1941–1944
Soviet Union 1944–1991
Russian Federation 1991–present

It was founded in the end of the 1930s due to the construction of Rugozersky timber industry enterprise. It was granted urban-type settlement status in 1965.

Muyezersky population
- 2010 Census: 3,328
- 2002 Census: 4,007
- 1989 Census: 4,400
- 1979 Census: 3,826

== Administrative and municipal status ==
Within the framework of administrative divisions, Muyezersky serves as the administrative center of Muyezersky District, of which it is a part. As a municipal division, Muyezersky is incorporated within Muyezersky Municipal District as Muyezerskoye Urban Settlement.
