= Muyezersky District =

Muyezersky District Муезерский район (Russian)
- District
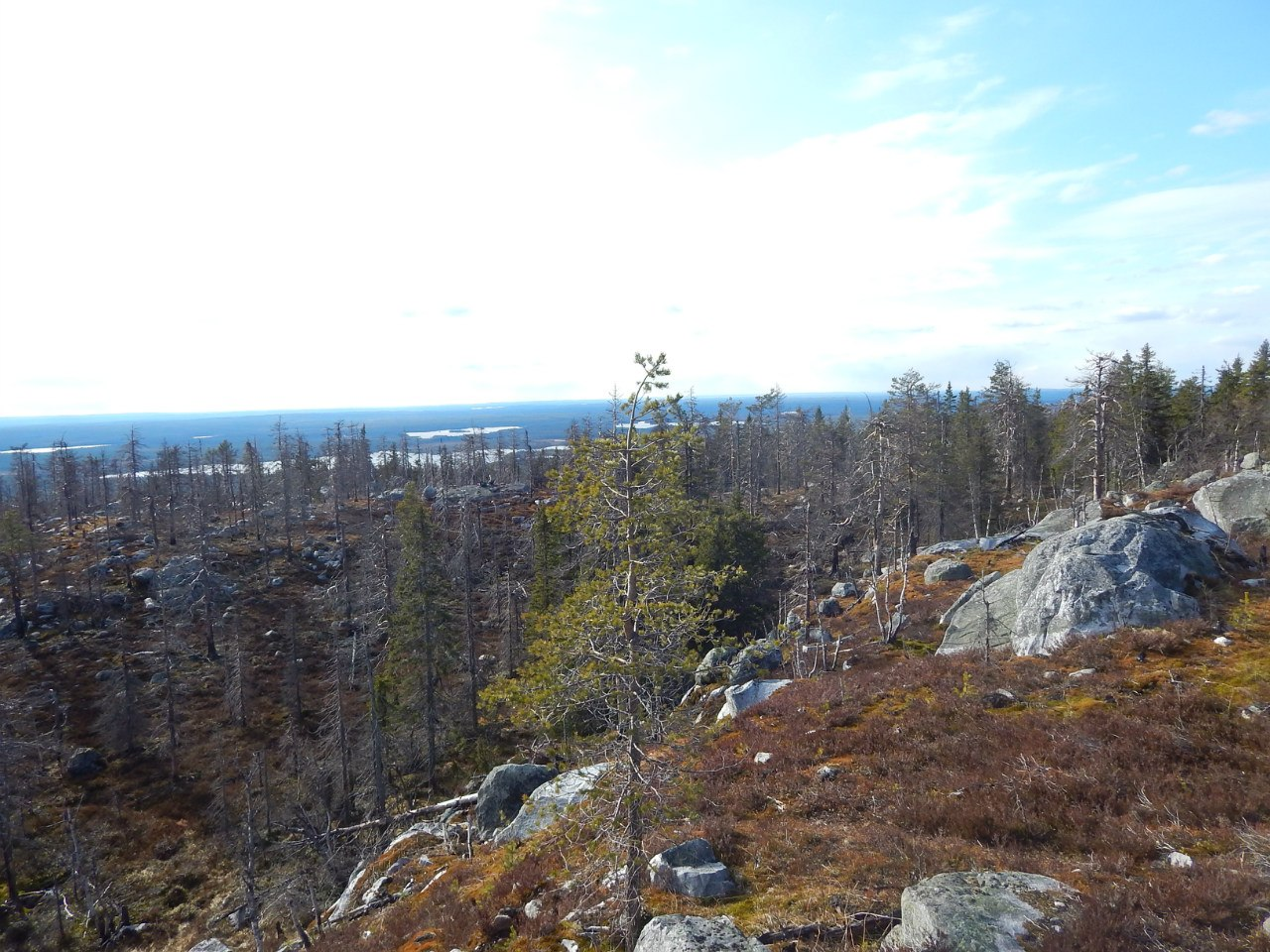
- View from Mount Vottovaara, a protected area of Russia in Muyezersky District

- Coat of arms
- Location of Muyezersky District in the Republic of Karelia
- Coordinates: 63°57′N 31°59′E
- Country: Russia
- Federal subject: Republic of Karelia
- Established: 30 December 1966
- Administrative center: Muyezersky

Area
  - Total: 17,600 km^{2} (6,800 sq mi)

Population (2010 Census)
  - Total: 12,236
  - Density: 0.695/km^{2} (1.80/sq mi)
  - Urban: 27.2%
  - Rural: 72.8%

Administrative structure
  - Inhabited localities: 1 urban-type settlements, 23 rural localities

Municipal structure
  - Municipally incorporated as: Muyezersky Municipal District
  - Municipal divisions: 1 urban settlements, 7 rural settlements
- Time zone: UTC+3 (UTC+03:00)
- OKTMO ID: 86627000
- Website: http://www.muezersky.ru

Population of Muyezersky District
- 2010 Census: 12,236
- 2002 Census: 16,556
- 1989 Census: 20,638
- 1979 Census: 21,947

Muyezersky District (Russian: Муезе́рский райо́н; Karelian: Mujejärven piiri) is an administrative district (raion), one of the fifteen in the Republic of Karelia, Russia. It is located in the west of the republic. The area of the district is 17,600 square kilometers (6,800 sq mi). Its administrative center is the urban locality (an urban-type settlement) of Muyezersky. As of the 2010 Census, the total population of the district was 12,236, with the population of the administrative center accounting for 27.2% of that number.

== Administrative and municipal status ==
Within the framework of administrative divisions, Muyezersky District is one of the fifteen in the Republic of Karelia and has administrative jurisdiction over one urban-type settlement (Muyezersky) and twenty-three rural localities. As a municipal division, the district is incorporated as Muyezersky Municipal District. The urban-type settlement of Muyezersky is incorporated into an urban settlement, while the twenty-three rural localities are incorporated into seven rural settlements within the municipal district. The urban-type settlement of Muyezersky serves as the administrative center of both the administrative and municipal district.
