= Åland Highway 3 =

Road in Åland Islands, Finland

Highway 3
- Huvudväg 3 (Swedish); Päätie 3 (Finnish)
- Lemlandsvägen; Långnäsvägen
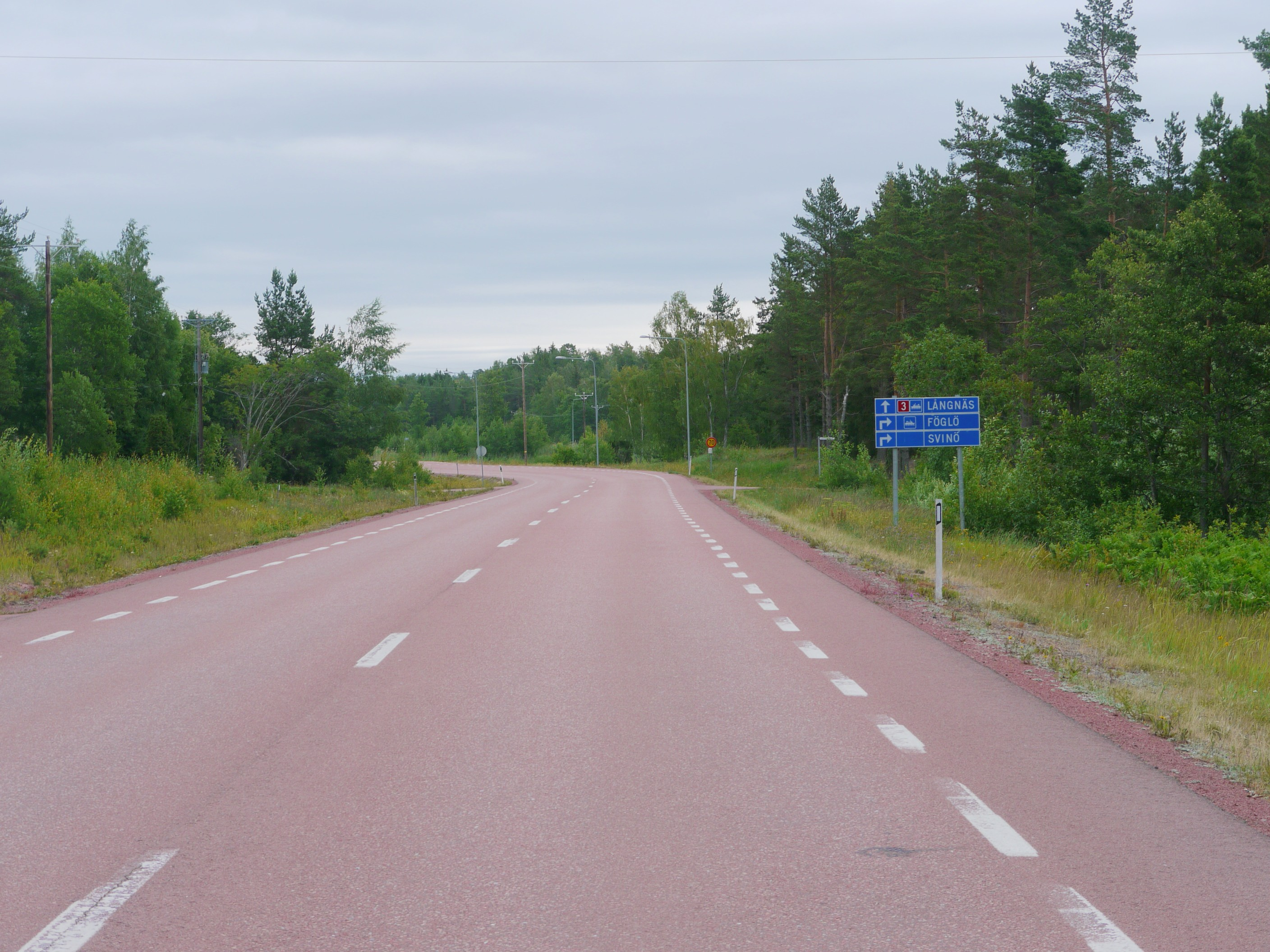
- Main road 3 near the Svinö village of Lumparland

Route information
- Length: 26 km (16 mi)

Major junctions
- From: Mariehamn
- To: Lumparland

Location
- Country: Finland
- Autonomous region: Åland

Highway system
- Transport in the Åland Islands

Highway 3 (Swedish: Huvudväg 3) is a road in Åland that starts in the capital city Mariehamn and ends in the Långnäs port of Lumparland. The length of the road is 26 kilometers. The road starts at the roundabout near Mariehamn Hospital, which also originates on Highway 1 and Highway 2.

The only attraction along the road is the Lemström Canal.

== Route ==
The road passes through the following localities:

- Mariehamn
- Jomala
- Lemland
- Lumparland

== See also ==
- Transport in Åland
- Finnish national road 3

== Source ==
- Grönroos, Matti (2007). "Ahvenanmaan tiet" (in Finnish).
- Isaksson, Krister (August 13, 2018). "Åland – gör det vi inte gör". Bicycling.se (in Swedish).
