= Åva =

Island and village in Brändö, Åland Islands, Finland

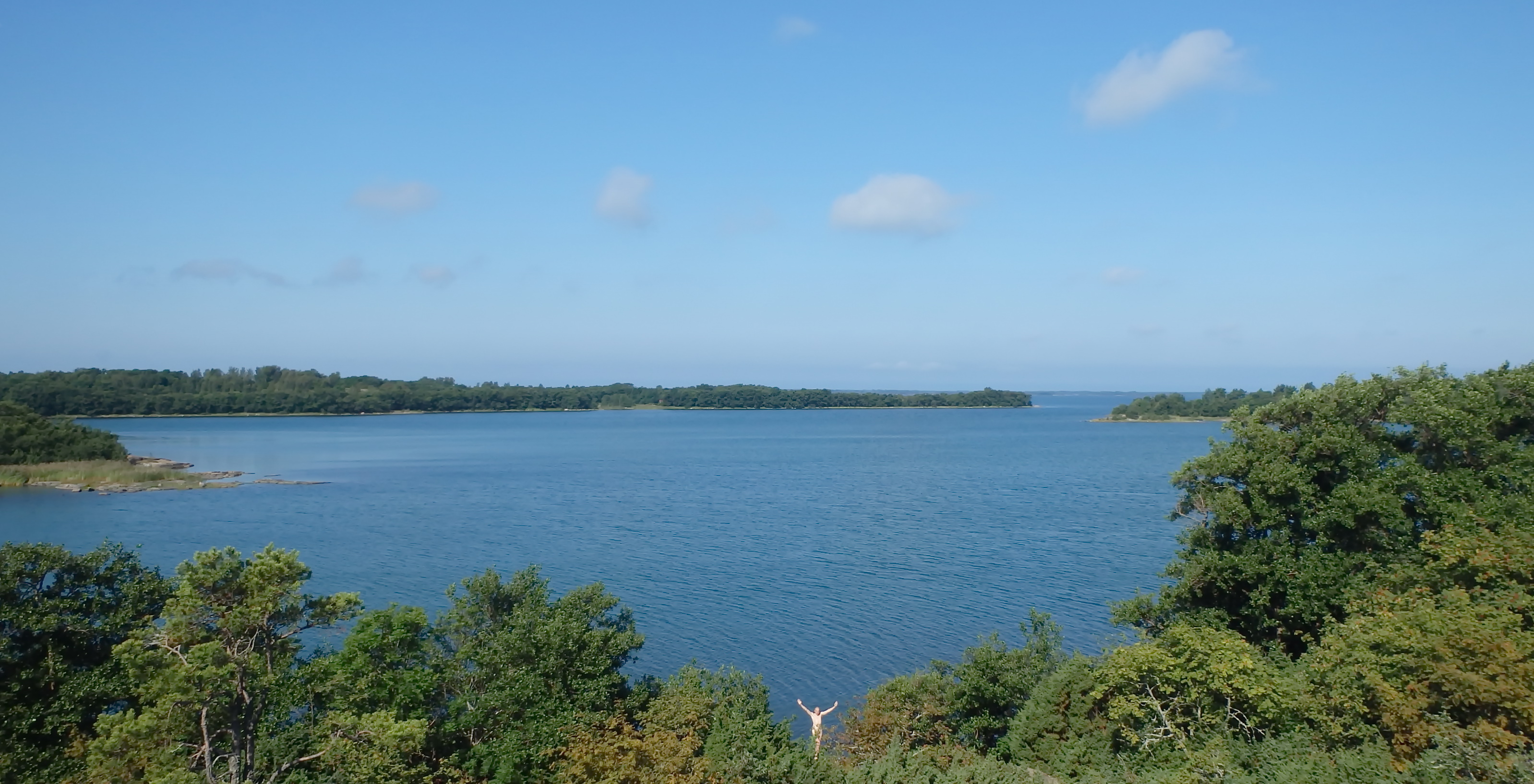

- Location of Åva in Åland

Geography
- Location: Baltic Sea
- Coordinates: 60°28′N 21°05′E
- Archipelago: Åland
- Adjacent to: Archipelago Sea
- Area: 6.96 km^{2} (2.69 sq mi)

Administration
- Finland
- Region: Åland
- Municipality: Brändö

Demographics
- Population: 96 (2020)
- Pop. density: 13.8/km^{2} (35.7/sq mi)
- Languages: Finland; Swedish

Additional information
- Postal code: 22940

Åva is an island and village in the municipality of Brändö, Åland, Finland. As of 2020, Åva has 96 inhabitants. The island is connected to Brändö village in the south by road banks and a bridge, on the northern part of the island there is Åva harbour which is served by Ålandstrafiken ferries to Jurmo and to Vartsala (with a connection further to the Finnish mainland).

== Description ==
The island's area is 6.96 square kilometres and its greatest length is 5 kilometres in a north–south direction. Åva is surrounded by the Jurmo stream and the island of Jurmo to the north, the bay of Skiftet to the east, the Åva stream and the island of Brändö to the south, and Ängskärsfjärden to the west.

== Etymology ==
The name Åva is of uncertain origin.

== Demography ==
Population evolution since 2000:

Historical population
Year	Pop.	±%
2000	77	—
2005	89	+15.6%
2010	84	−5.6%
2015	83	−1.2%
2020	96	+15.7%
