= Åland Highway 2 =

Road in Åland Islands, Finland

Highway 2
- Huvudväg 2 (Swedish); Päätie 2 (Finnish)
- Nya Godbyvägen; Sundsvägen

Route information
- Length: 31 km (19 mi)

Major junctions
- From: Mariehamn
- To: Sund

Location
- Country: Finland
- Autonomous region: Åland

Highway system
- Transport in the Åland Islands

Highway 2 (Swedish: Huvudväg 2) is a road in Åland that starts in the capital city Mariehamn and ends in Sund. The length of the road is 31 kilometers. The road starts at the roundabout near Mariehamn Hospital, which also originates on Highway 1 and Highway 3.

In Jomala, the road bypasses the nearby St. Olaf's Church, on the cliff north of Finström just before Ödkarbyviken, on the cliff above the tunnel Uffe på Berget Café and Kastelholm Castle south of the village of Kastelholm, Sund.

== Route ==
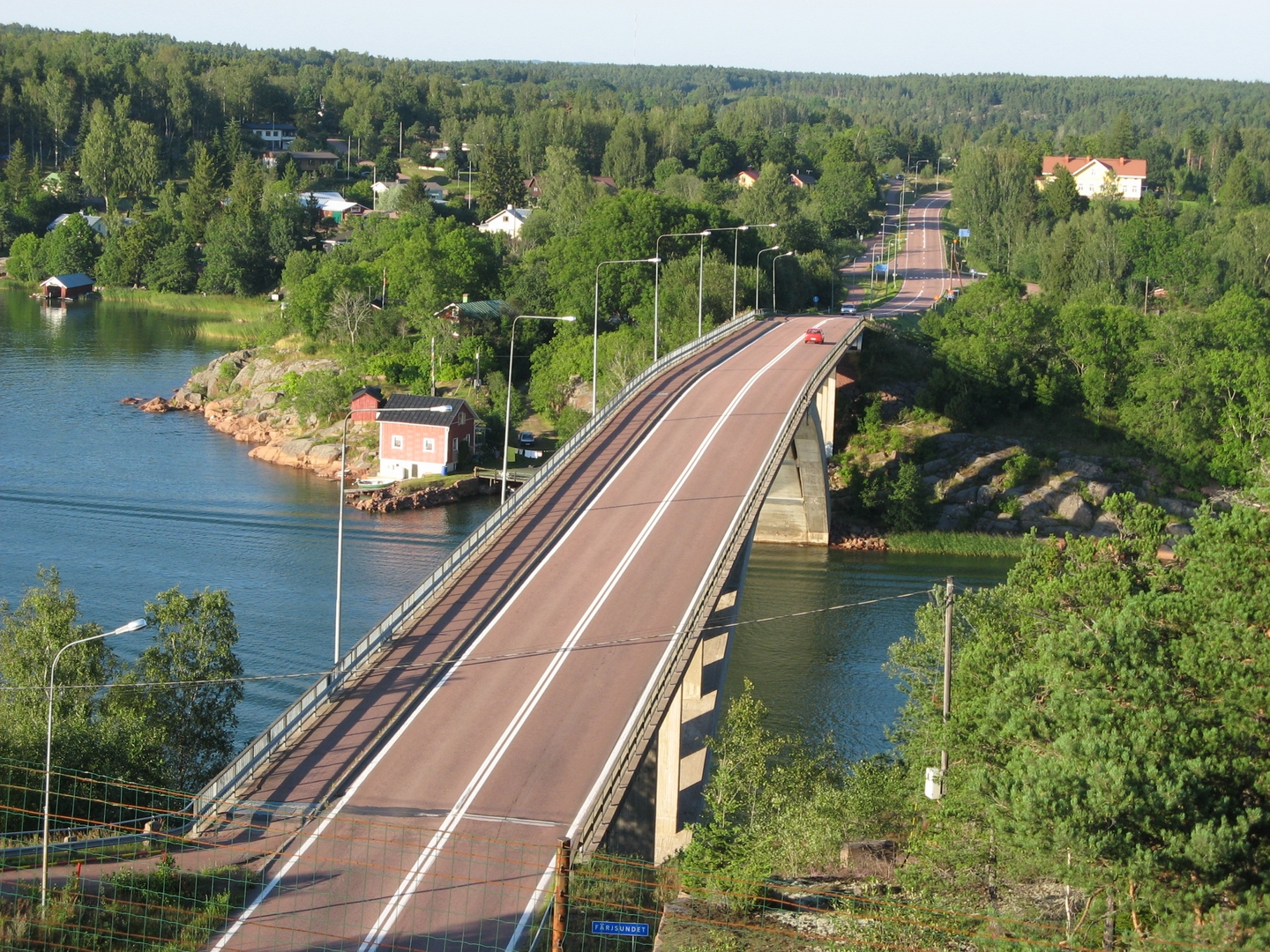
Main road 2 on the Färjsundet bridge

The road passes through the following localities:

- Mariehamn
- Jomala
- Finström
- Sund

== See also ==
- Transport in Åland
- Finnish national road 2

== Source ==
- Grönroos, Matti (2007). "Ahvenanmaan tiet" (in Finnish).
- Isaksson, Krister (August 13, 2018). "Åland – gör det vi inte gör". Bicycling.se (in Swedish).
