= Åland Highway 1 =

Road in Åland Islands, Finland

Highway 1
- Huvudväg 1 (Swedish); Päätie 1 (Finnish)
- Hammarlandsvägen; Eckerövägen

Route information
- Length: 32 km (20 mi)

Major junctions
- From: Mariehamn
- To: Eckerö

Location
- Country: Finland
- Autonomous region: Åland

Highway system
- Transport in the Åland Islands

Highway 1 (Swedish: Huvudväg 1) is a road in Åland that starts in the capital city Mariehamn and ends in Eckerö. The length of the road is 32 kilometers. The road starts at the roundabout near Mariehamn Hospital, which also originates on Highway 2 and Highway 3.

Along the road is Hammarland Church in Hammarland and the Postal Museum in Eckerö.

== Route ==
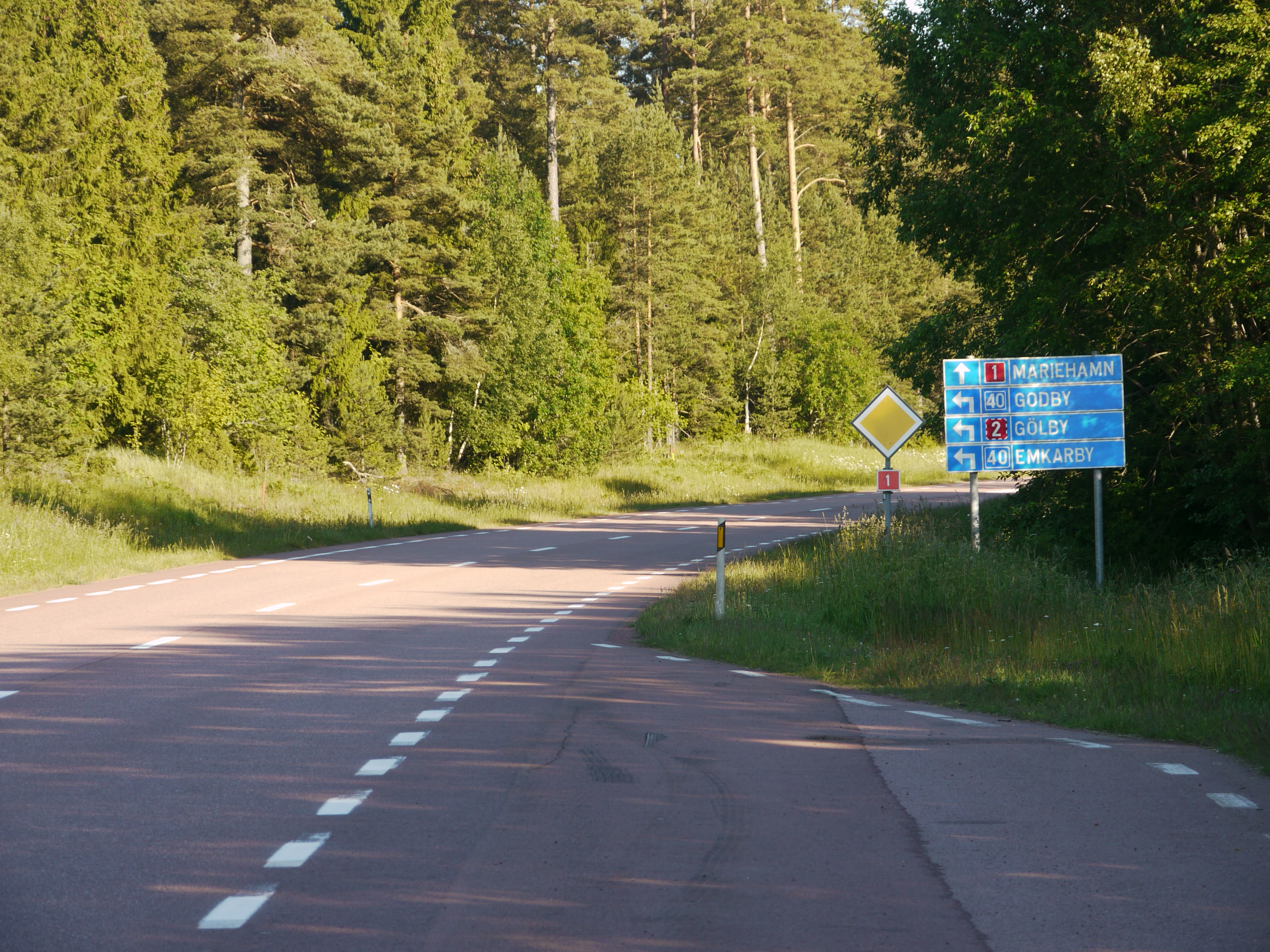
Main road 1 in Djäkenböle, Hammarland

The road passes through the following localities:

- Mariehamn
- Jomala
- Hammarland
- Eckerö

== See also ==
- Transport in Åland
- Finnish national road 1

== Source ==
- Grönroos, Matti (2007). "Ahvenanmaan tiet" (in Finnish).
- Isaksson, Krister (August 13, 2018). "Åland – gör det vi inte gör". Bicycling.se (in Swedish).
