= Jomala =

- Municipality
- Jomala kommun
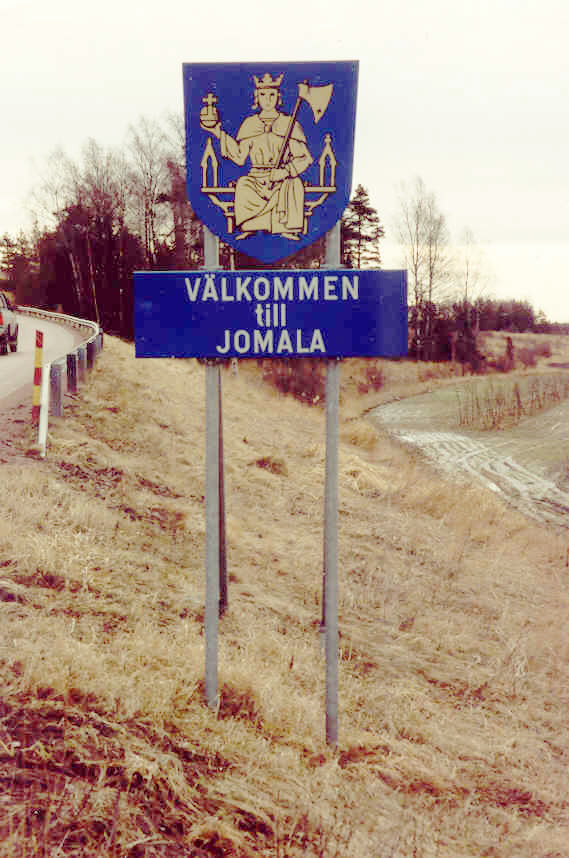
- "Welcome to Jomala." The coat of arms of Jomala features St. Olav sitting on a throne and holding an axe and a globus cruciger

- Coat of arms

- Location of Jomala in Finland

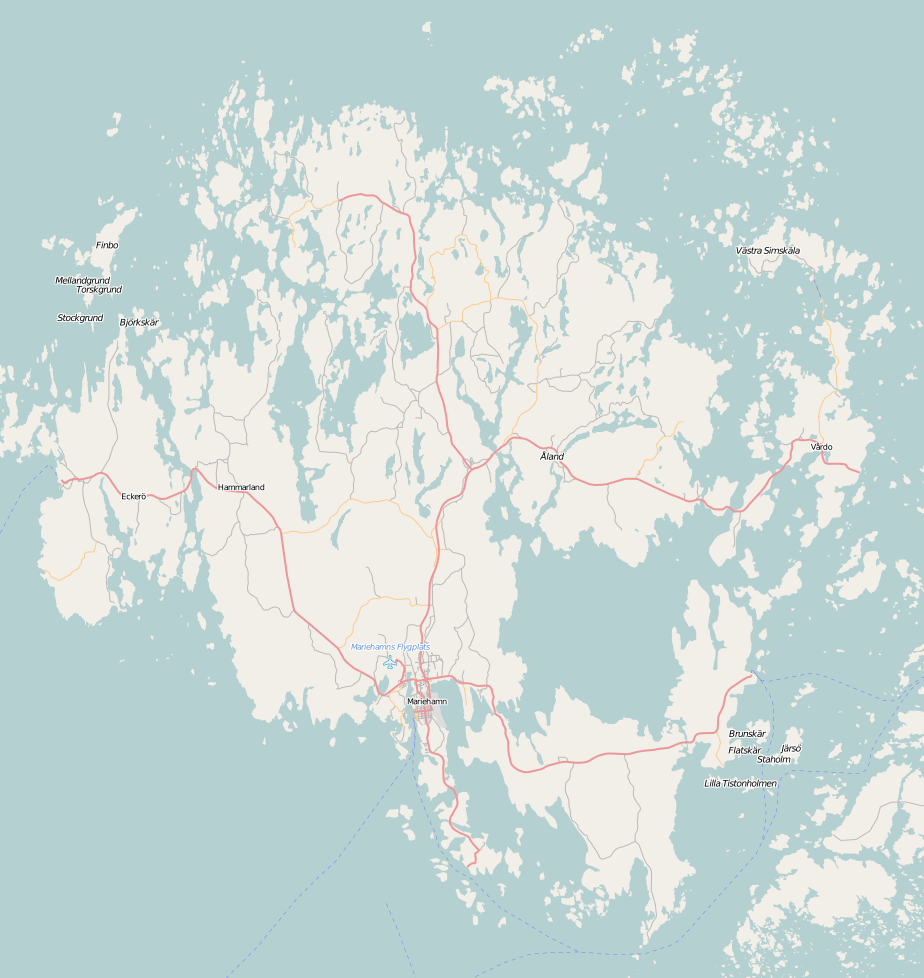
- Location in Åland
- Coordinates: 60°09′N 019°57′E
- Country: Finland
- Region: Åland
- Sub-region: Countryside

Government
  - Municipal manager: Christian Dreyer

Area (2018-01-01)
  - Total: 687.00 km^{2} (265.25 sq mi)
  - Land: 142.73 km^{2} (55.11 sq mi)
  - Water: 544.43 km^{2} (210.21 sq mi)
  - Rank: 282nd largest in Finland

Population (2025-12-31)
  - Total: 5,817
  - Rank: 157th largest in Finland
  - Density: 40.76/km^{2} (105.6/sq mi)

Population by native language
  - Swedish: 87.2% (official)
  - Finnish: 4.6%
  - Others: 8.2%

Population by age
  - 0 to 14: 21.6%
  - 15 to 64: 63.3%
  - 65 or older: 15.2%
- Time zone: UTC+02:00 (EET)
  - Summer (DST): UTC+03:00 (EEST)
- Website: www.jomala.ax

Jomala is a municipality of Åland, an autonomous territory of Finland. In terms of population, it is the next largest after Mariehamn, the capital of Åland.

The municipality has a population of approximately 5,800 and covers an area of 687.00 square kilometres (265.25 sq mi) of which 544.43 km^{2} (210.21 sq mi) is water. The population density is 40.76 inhabitants per square kilometre (105.6/sq mi).

The municipality is unilingually Swedish.

Mariehamn Airport is located in Jomala. Three of Åland's four highways cross the municipality of Jomala as they start from Mariehamn; highway 1 runs west to Eckerö, highway 2 northeast to Sund and highway 3 east to Lumparland.

== History ==
"Jomala" is the name of a god common to many Finno-Ugric peoples. Jumala is Finnish for god and Jomala is one of the sites where the Christian church organized itself in Finland. Other versions of the name that have occurred are Jwmala in 1356, Jomalum in 1414, Jomala in 1486 and Jwmala in 1494. One of oldest churches in Finland stands here as testament to these times.

Before the city of Mariehamn was established in 1861, the peninsula where the city is situated was a part of Jomala.

== Sights ==
The church of Jomala is dedicated to the patron saint of Åland, St. Olav. It is the oldest surviving church in Finland and it is situated in the village of Prästgården. The oldest parts of the church date from the 13th century. The church tower is 52 meters tall and there is also a memorial for all the Ålanders who emigrated. Another memorial refers to sailors who lost their lives at sea. The "King of Åland" Julius Sundblom is buried here. A large medieval cemetery with graves from the Iron Age can be visited behind the church.

The Lemström channel divides Jomala from its neighboring municipality, Lemland. It was widened by Russian POWs in 1882.

The Kungsö battery was one of the ten coastal batteries which the Russians built in Åland during the First World War in 1916. The battery was situated 32 meters above sea level, on the highest point of Dalsberg. Finnish, Swedish and German troops invaded it in 1918. It was dismantled in 1919 by Finnish civilian workers.

There are various well-preserved windmills in Jomala, e.g. on Norrgård farm in Björsby.

== Culture ==
Since Jomala belongs to the Swedish-speaking areas of Finland, Midsummer is celebrated every year by hoisting up a maypole. It was a tribute to the sun in the ancient times. Harvest festivities are held every September.

== Geography ==
Jomala is bordered by Lemland in the southwest, Mariehamn in the south, Hammarland in the northwest, Finström in the north and Sund in the northeast.

=== Villages ===
These are Andersböle, Björsby, Buskböle, Dalkarby, Djurvik, Gottby, Gölby, Hammarudda, Hinderböle, Ingby, Jomalaby, Karrböle, Kila, Kungsöby, Möckelby, Möckelö, Norrsunda, Rasmansböle, Ringsböle, Sviby, Södersunda, Torp, Ulvsby, Vargsunda, Västansunda, Västerkalmare, Ytterby, Ytternäs, Ödanböle, Önningeby, Österkalmare and Överby.

== Climate ==
Climate data for Jomala Jomalaby (1991–2020 normals, extremes 1972–present)
Month	Jan	Feb	Mar	Apr	May	Jun	Jul	Aug	Sep	Oct	Nov	Dec	Year
Record high °C (°F)	10.8 (51.4)	10.7 (51.3)	17.4 (63.3)	23.1 (73.6)	27.4 (81.3)	29.3 (84.7)	31.6 (88.9)	30.0 (86.0)	25.3 (77.5)	19.1 (66.4)	15.7 (60.3)	11.0 (51.8)	31.6 (88.9)
Mean maximum °C (°F)	5.9 (42.6)	6.0 (42.8)	10.6 (51.1)	16.2 (61.2)	21.7 (71.1)	24.0 (75.2)	26.6 (79.9)	25.6 (78.1)	20.5 (68.9)	14.6 (58.3)	10.0 (50.0)	6.8 (44.2)	27.4 (81.3)
Mean daily maximum °C (°F)	0.9 (33.6)	0.4 (32.7)	3.2 (37.8)	8.3 (46.9)	13.8 (56.8)	17.9 (64.2)	21.2 (70.2)	20.4 (68.7)	15.6 (60.1)	9.7 (49.5)	5.2 (41.4)	2.5 (36.5)	9.9 (49.9)
Daily mean °C (°F)	−1.4 (29.5)	−2.4 (27.7)	−0.2 (31.6)	4.0 (39.2)	9.2 (48.6)	13.6 (56.5)	17.0 (62.6)	16.3 (61.3)	11.9 (53.4)	6.9 (44.4)	3.1 (37.6)	0.4 (32.7)	6.5 (43.8)
Mean daily minimum °C (°F)	−4.0 (24.8)	−5.3 (22.5)	−3.3 (26.1)	0.3 (32.5)	4.4 (39.9)	9.0 (48.2)	12.5 (54.5)	11.9 (53.4)	8.3 (46.9)	4.0 (39.2)	0.9 (33.6)	−2.0 (28.4)	3.1 (37.5)
Mean minimum °C (°F)	−15.0 (5.0)	−15.9 (3.4)	−12.9 (8.8)	−5.5 (22.1)	−2.3 (27.9)	2.7 (36.9)	6.3 (43.3)	5.2 (41.4)	0.7 (33.3)	−3.9 (25.0)	−6.2 (20.8)	−10.3 (13.5)	−19.2 (−2.6)
Record low °C (°F)	−32.0 (−25.6)	−33.1 (−27.6)	−23.2 (−9.8)	−13.2 (8.2)	−5.5 (22.1)	−1.0 (30.2)	2.5 (36.5)	1.0 (33.8)	−5.6 (21.9)	−11.0 (12.2)	−18.9 (−2.0)	−30.6 (−23.1)	−33.1 (−27.6)
Average precipitation mm (inches)	53 (2.1)	36 (1.4)	34 (1.3)	31 (1.2)	37 (1.5)	56 (2.2)	48 (1.9)	65 (2.6)	64 (2.5)	74 (2.9)	68 (2.7)	62 (2.4)	628 (24.7)
Average precipitation days	17	13	12	10	10	11	10	13	12	17	18	19	162
Source 1: FMI normals 1991–2020
Source 2: Record highs and lows

== People from Jomala ==
- Janne Holmén, long-distance runner, European champion in men's marathon
- Ida Zetterström, NHRA drag racing for JCM-Racing in the Top Fuel Dragster class

== Gallery ==
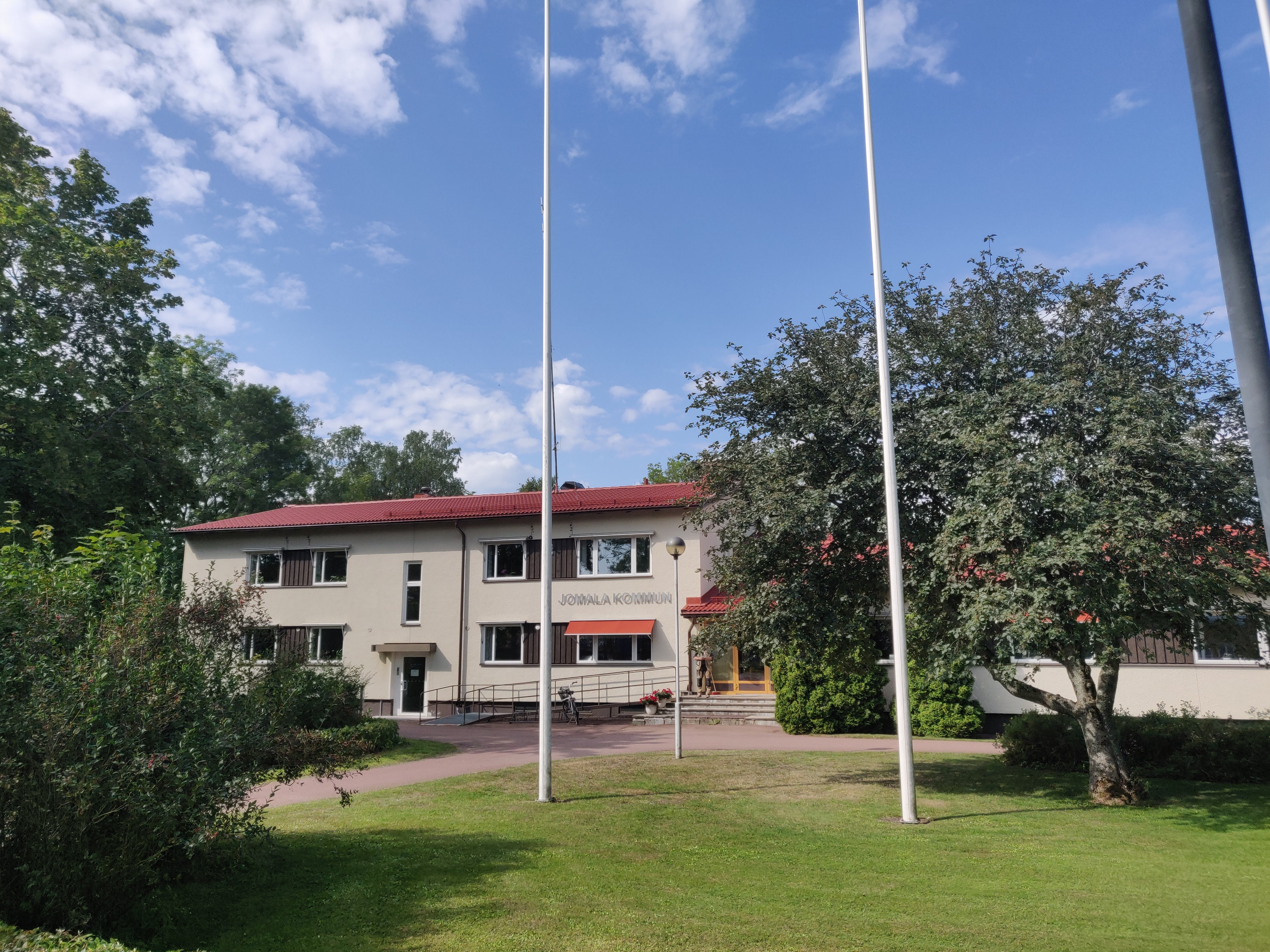
A town hall of Jomala

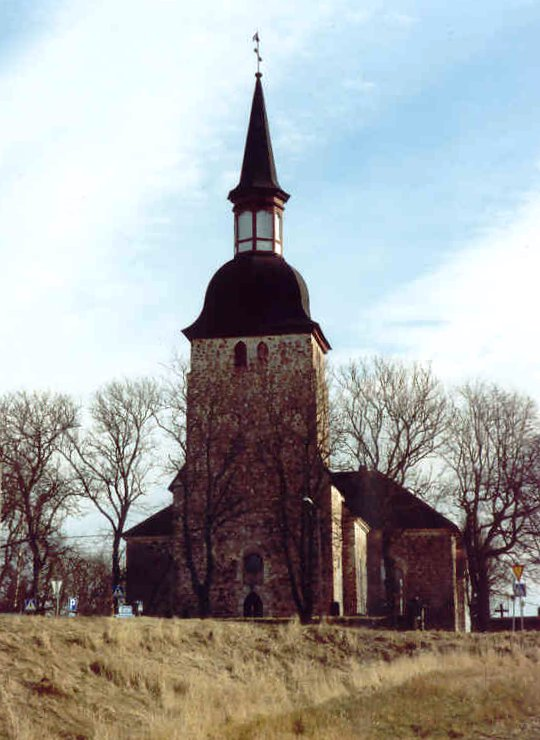
The church of Jomala in 1991

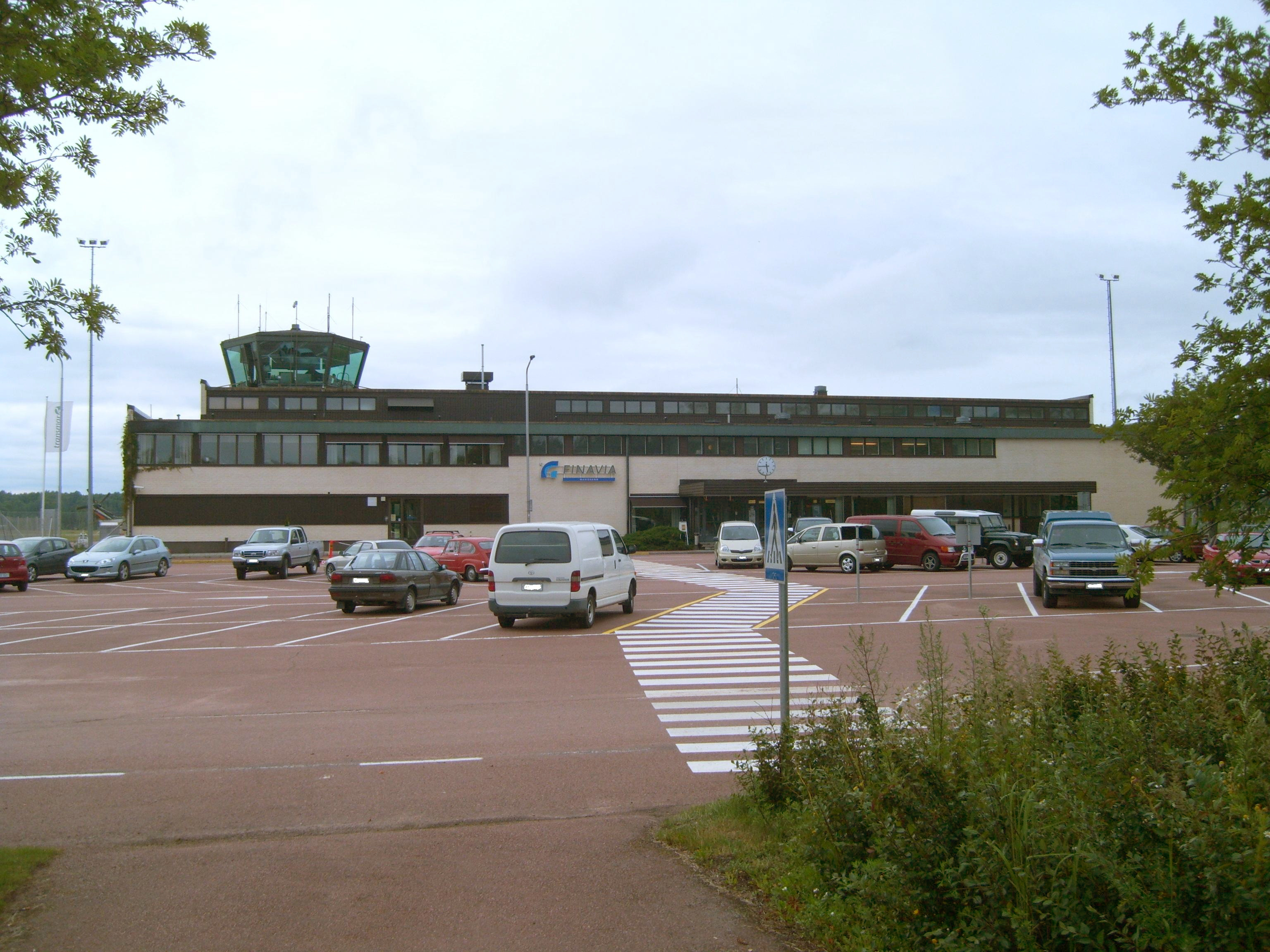
The Mariehamn Airport in Jomala

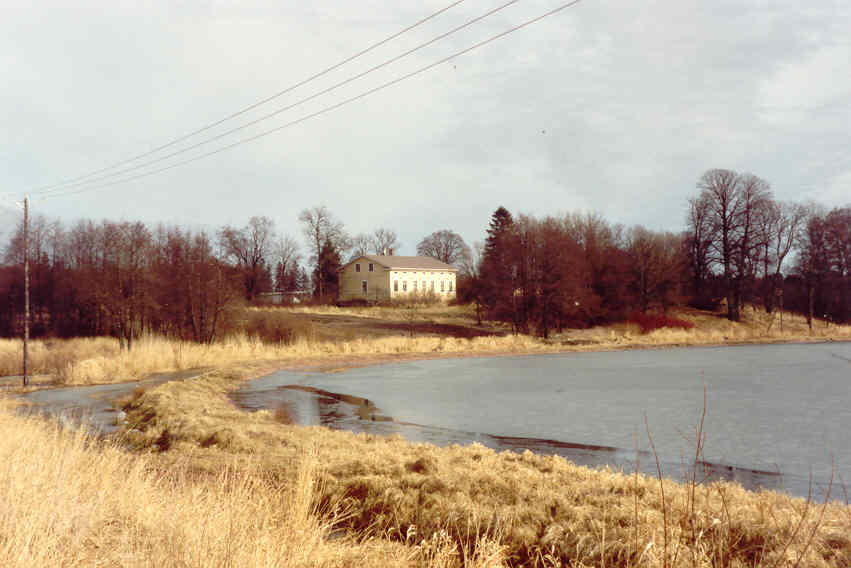
The Jomala Rectory as seen by Lake Dalkarby in 1991. The rectory was built in 1848 and an Art Nouveau veranda was added in the beginning of the 20th century

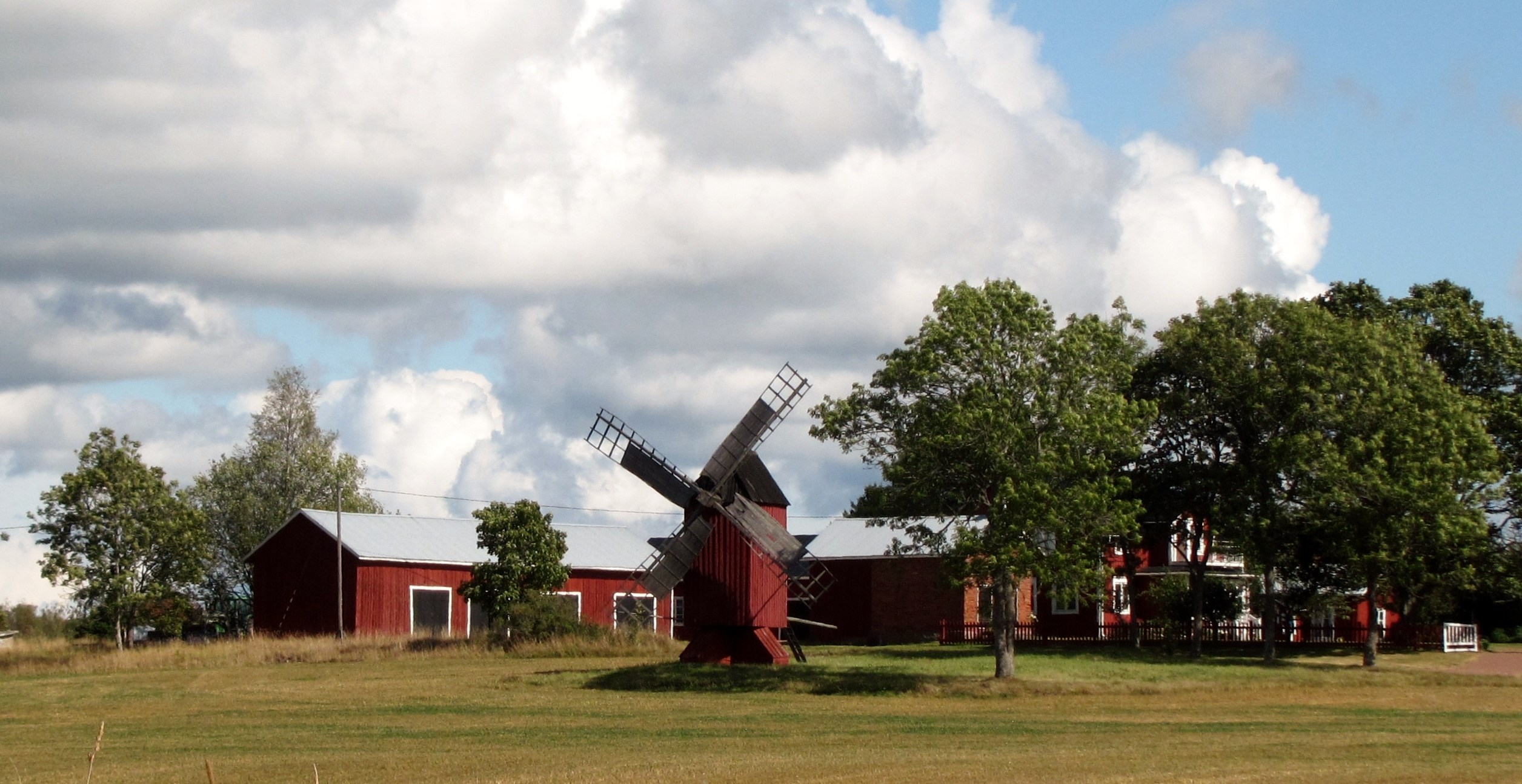
Windmill in Björsby
