= Brändö (disambiguation) =

Brändö is the name of several places:

- Brändö, a municipality on Åland.
- Brändö, (in Finnish: Kulosaari), a section of the city Helsingfors (Helsinki).
- Brändö, (in Finnish: Palosaari), a section of the city Vasa (Vaasa).
