= Ålandstrafiken =

Ferry operator in Åland, Finland

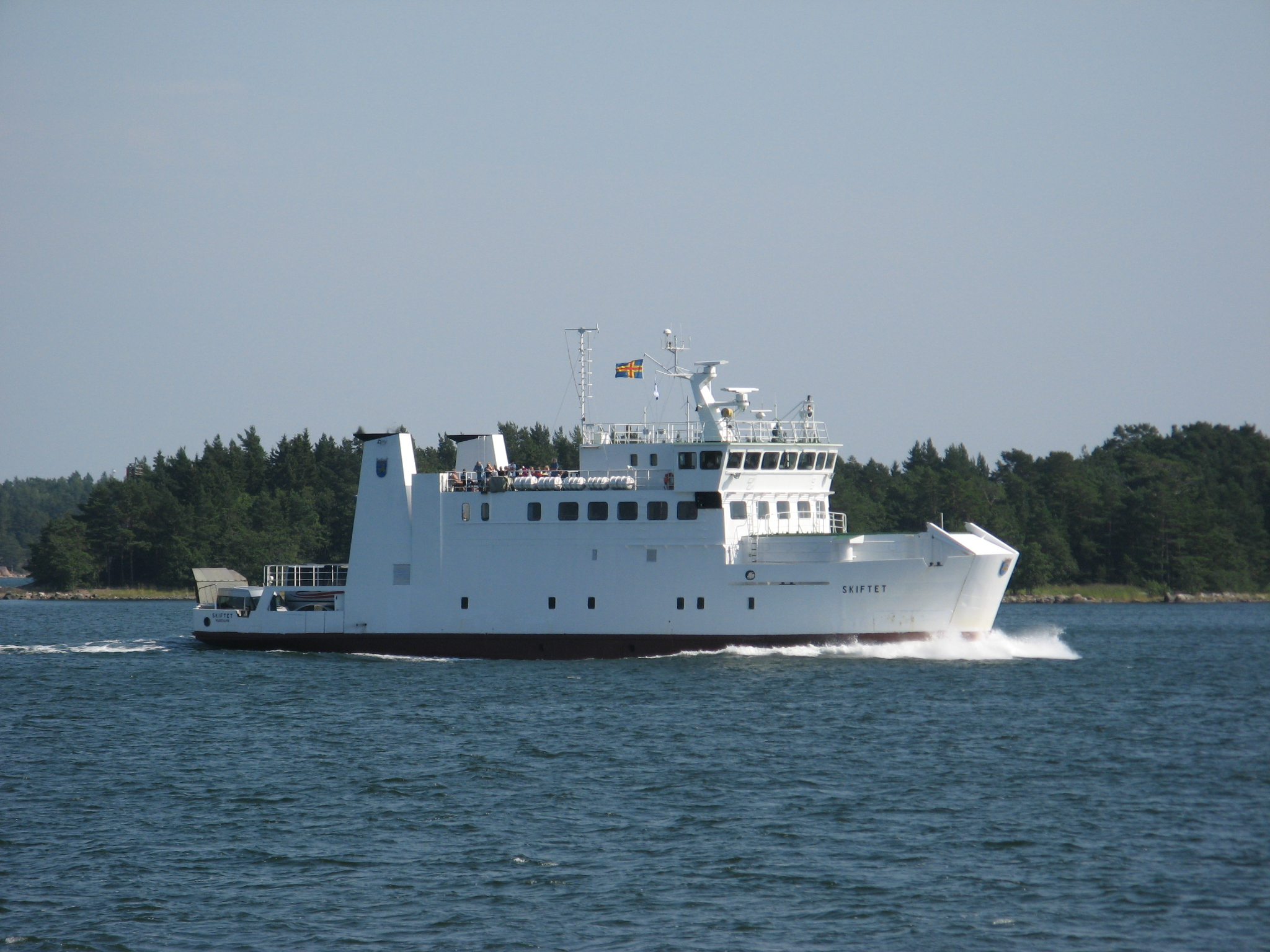
M/S Skiftet en route to Korpo

Ålandstrafiken is the public ferry authority of the Åland Islands, an autonomous, Swedish-speaking region of Finland in the Baltic Sea. It is managed by the Government of Åland, which oversees all inter-island ferry services as well as connections to the Finnish mainland.

== Overview ==
Ålandstrafiken coordinates and sells tickets for most ferry services within Åland and between Åland and western Finland. The network includes four main routes, several feeder lines, and six shorter cable ferries linking smaller inhabited islands.

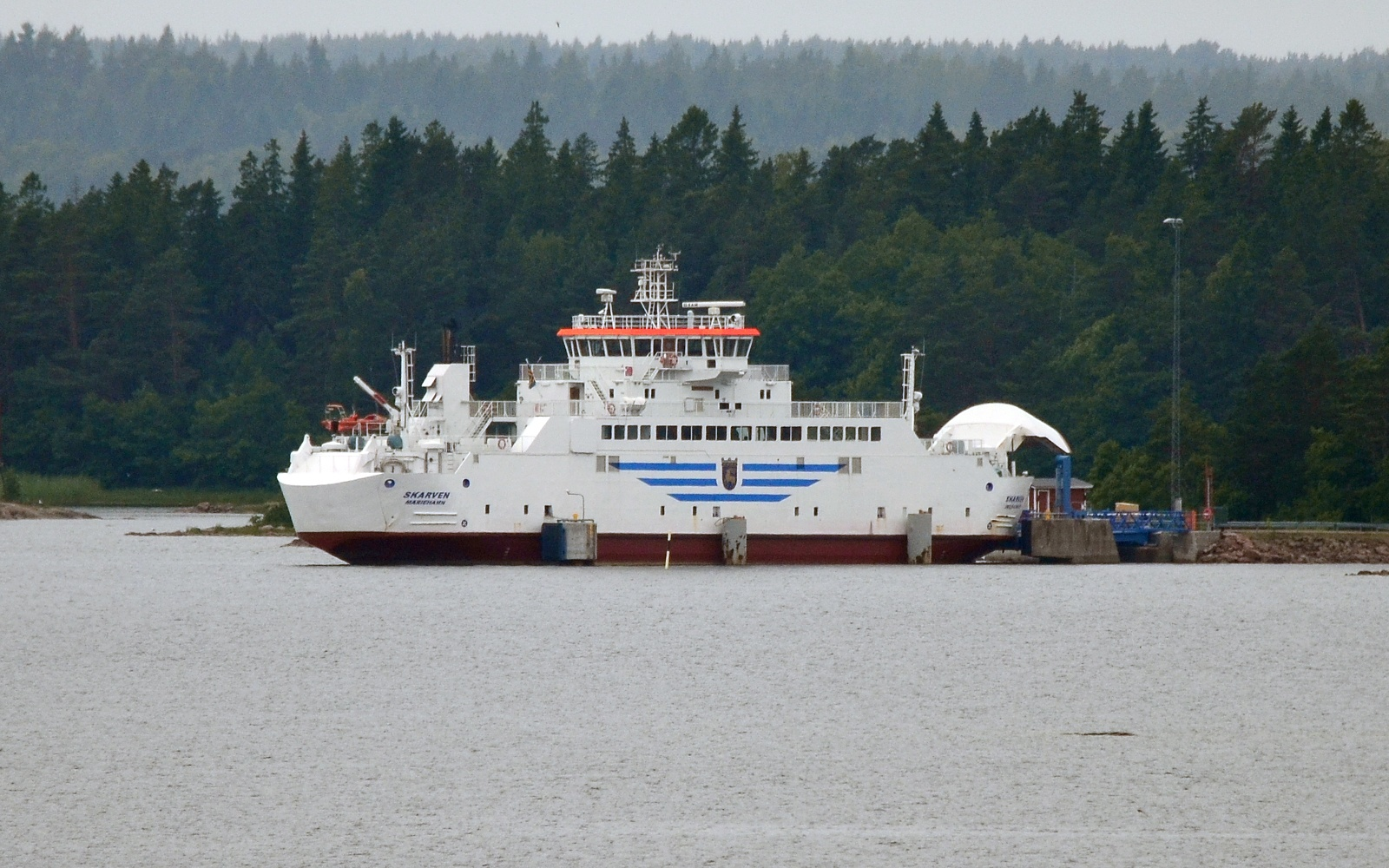
M/S Skarven at Svinö, Lumparland

== Routes ==
The system consists of four main ferry lines, with additional feeder and cable ferries. Major connections include:

- Northern Line: Hummelvik (Vårdö) – Enklinge – Kumlinge – Lappo (Brändö) – Torsholma (Brändö) – Åva (Brändö) – Osnäs (Kustavi, mainland Finland). Includes feeder links to Jurmo and Asterholma.
- Southern Line: Långnäs (Lumparland) – Överö (Föglö) – Sottunga – Husö – Kyrkogårdsö (Kökar) – Kökar – Galtby (Korpo, mainland Finland).
- Föglö Line: Svinö (Lumparland) – Degerby (Föglö).

In addition, six cable ferries provide short crossings between nearby islands, including Lappo–Björkö, Finnholma–Jyddö, Vårdö–Simskäla, Lumparland–Ängsö, Prästö–Töftö, and Snäckö–Seglinge.

== Fleet ==
The number and names of ferries in service may change from year to year. According to sources from 2015, Ålandstrafiken operated about thirteen main ferries along with several cable ferries.

== Gallery ==
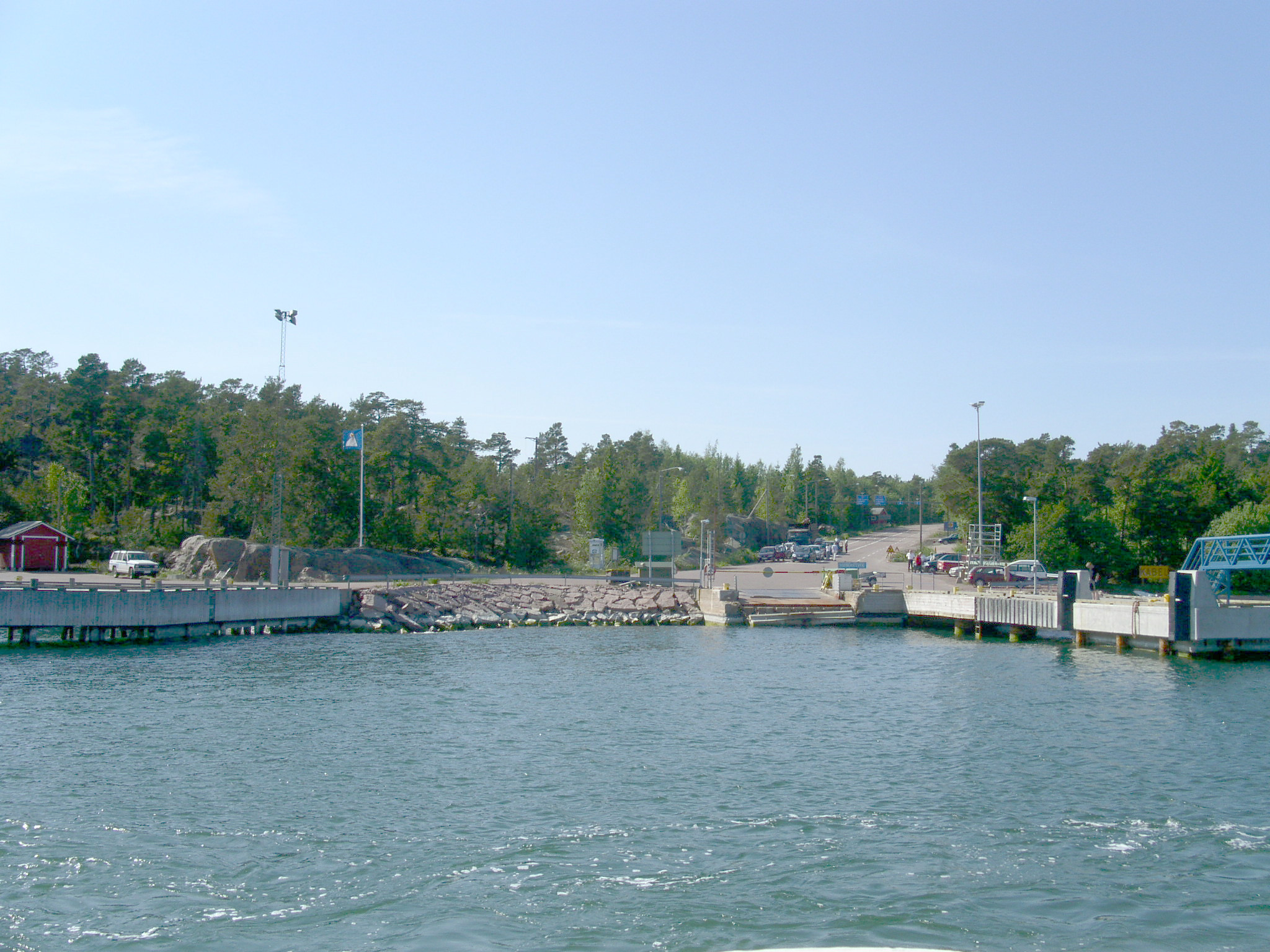
Hummelvik harbour, Vårdö

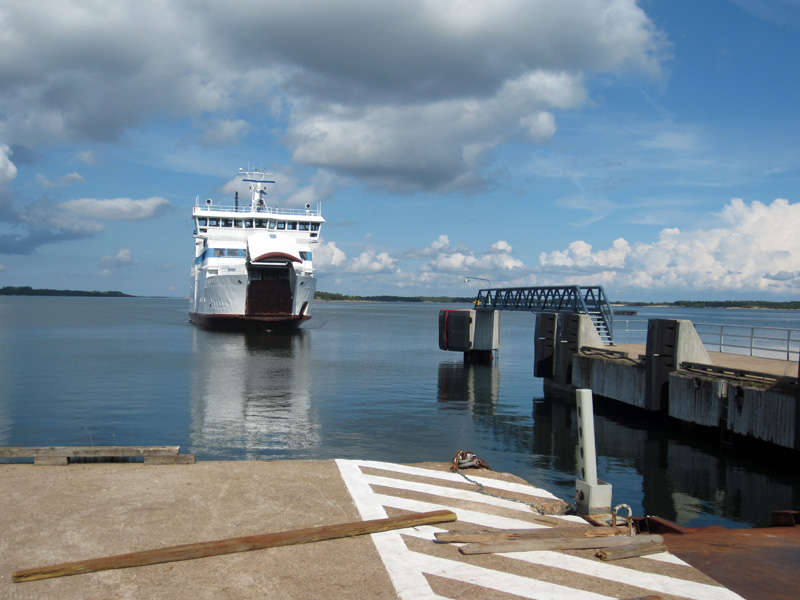
M/S Alfågeln at Kumlinge

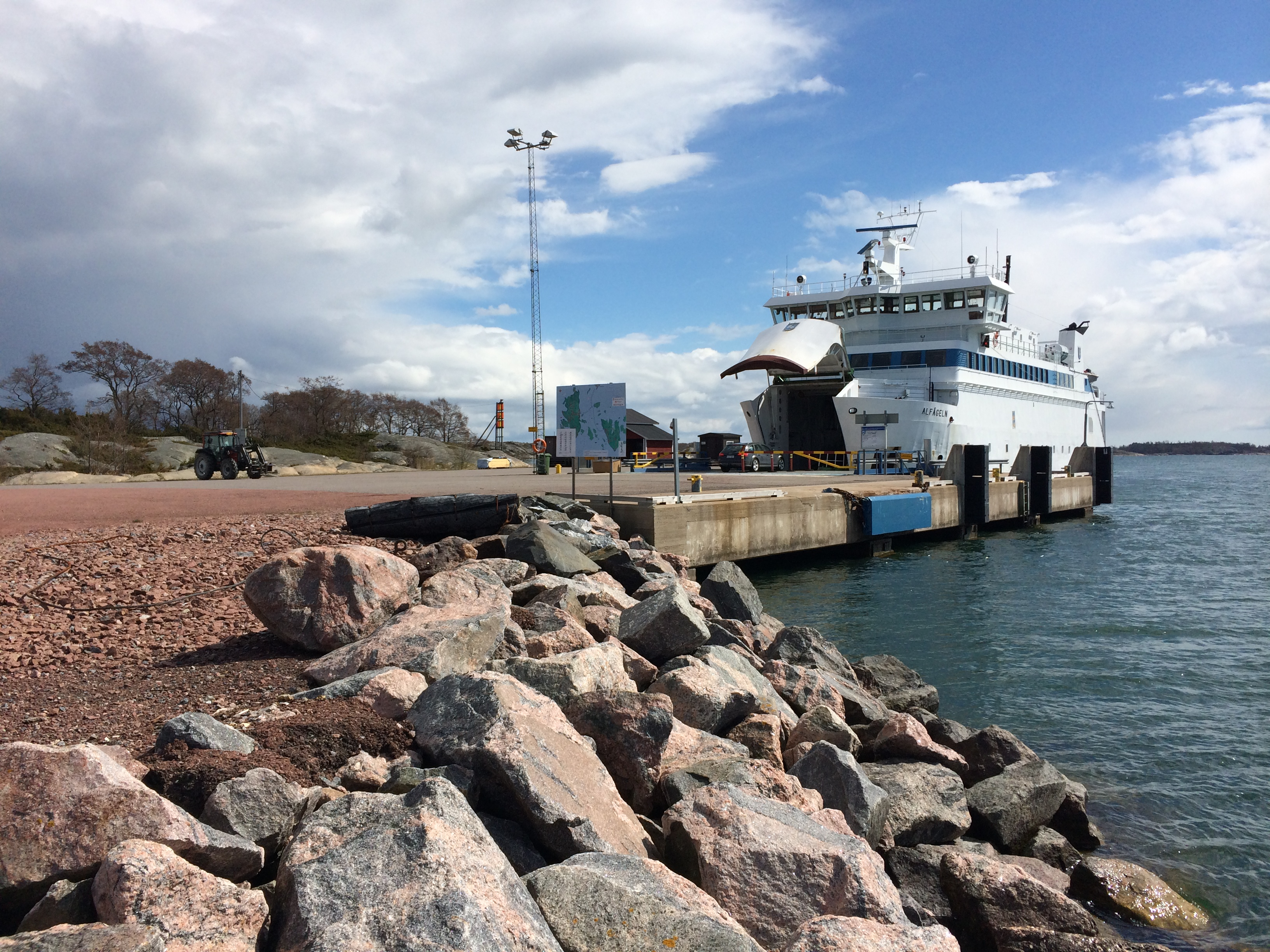
M/S Alfågeln at Torsholma, Brändö

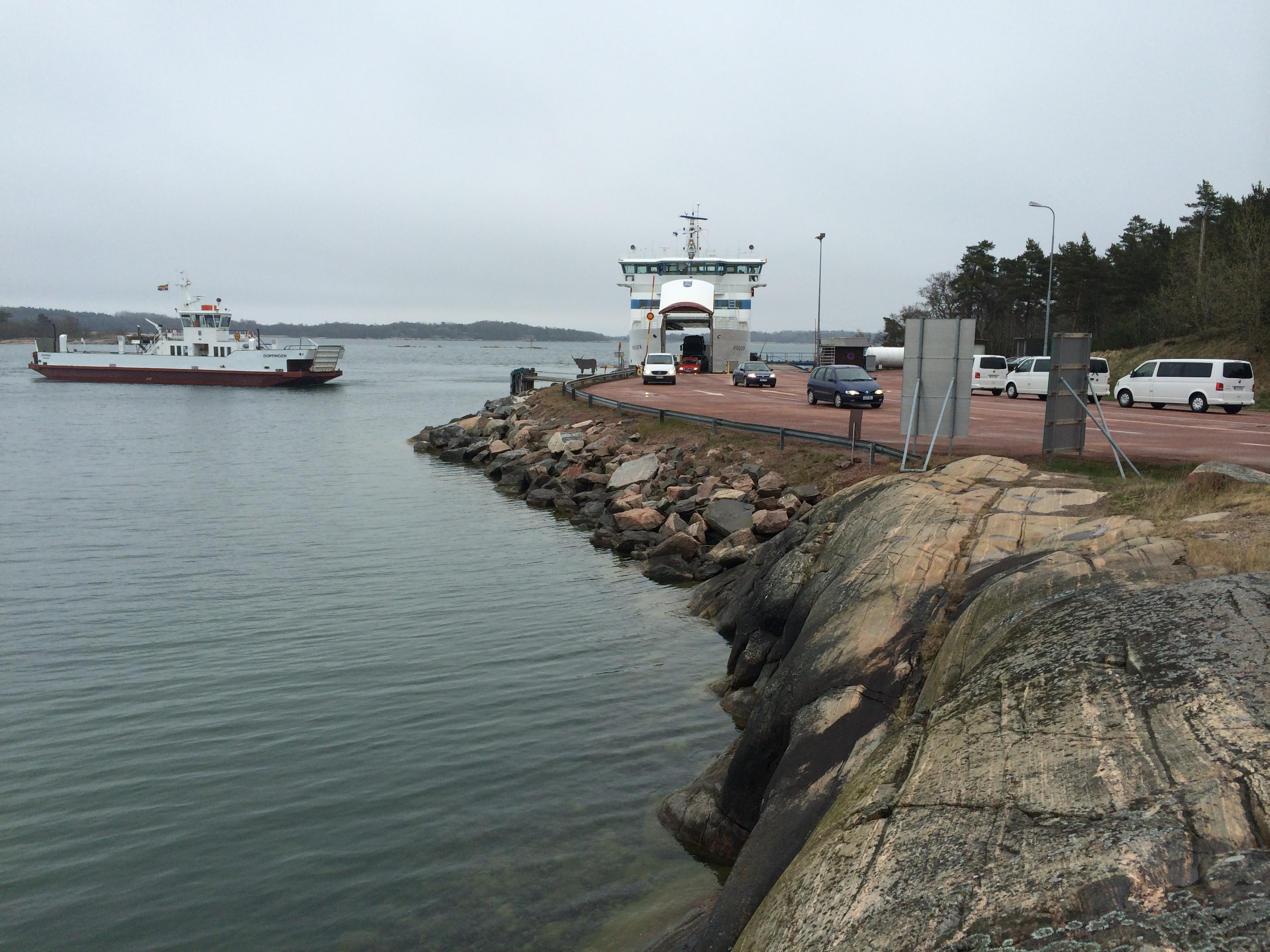
M/S Viggen and M/S Doppingen at Åva, Brändö

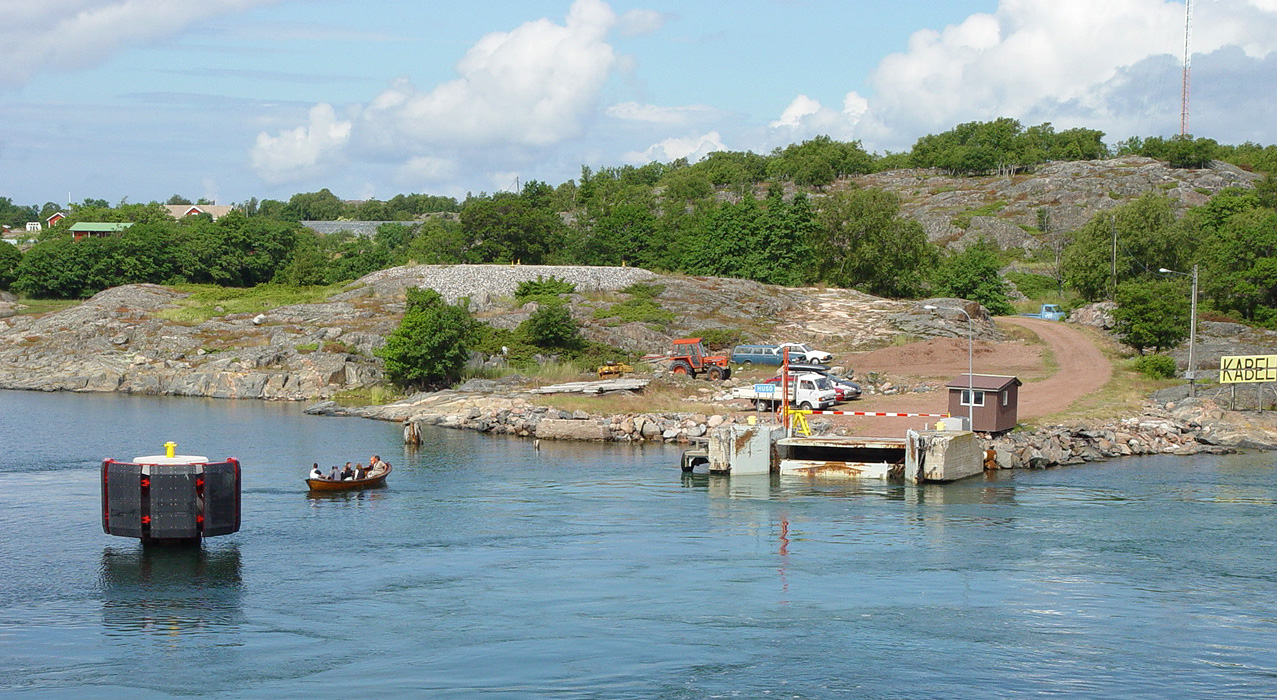
Husö, Sottunga

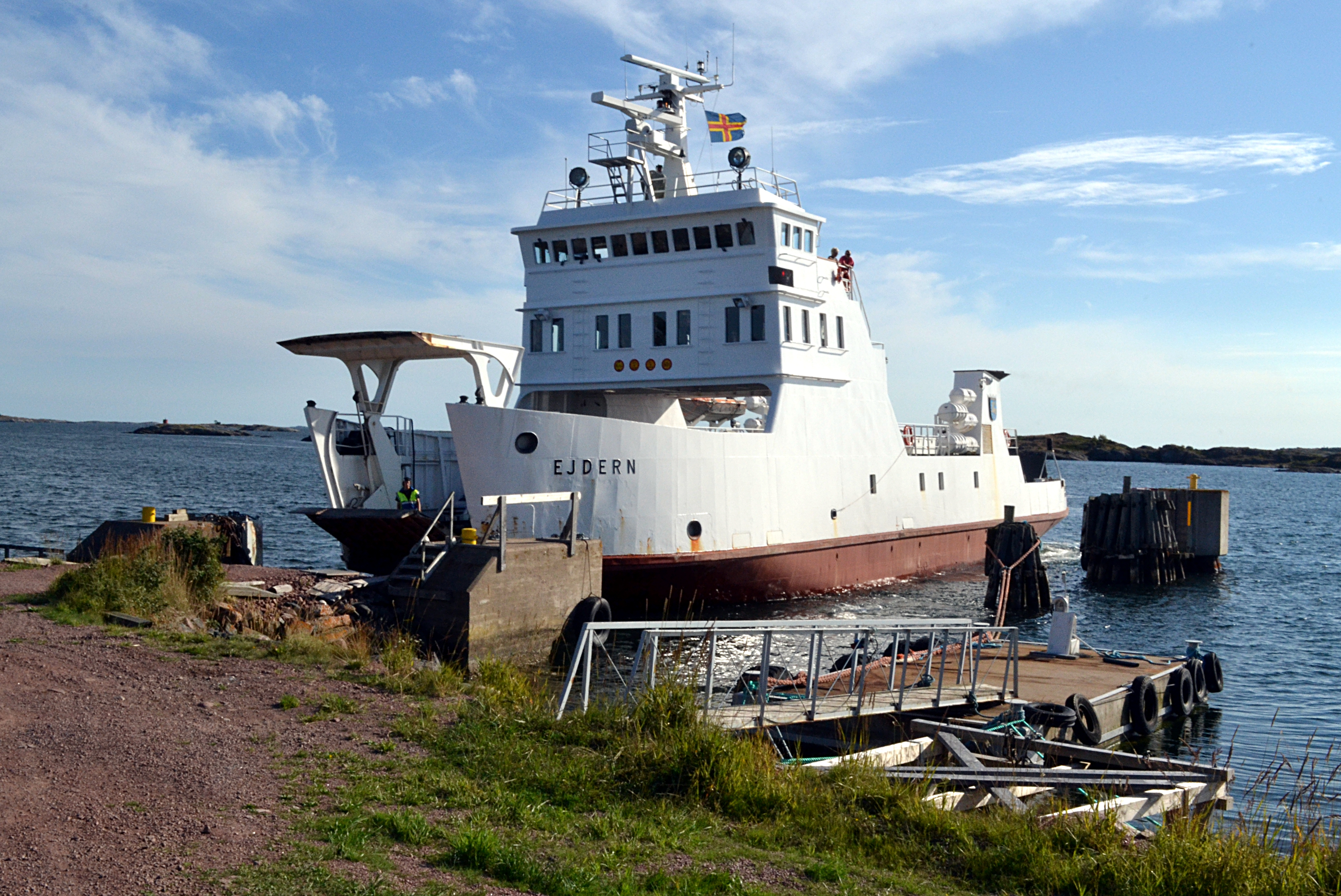
M/S Ejdern at Kyrkogårdsö

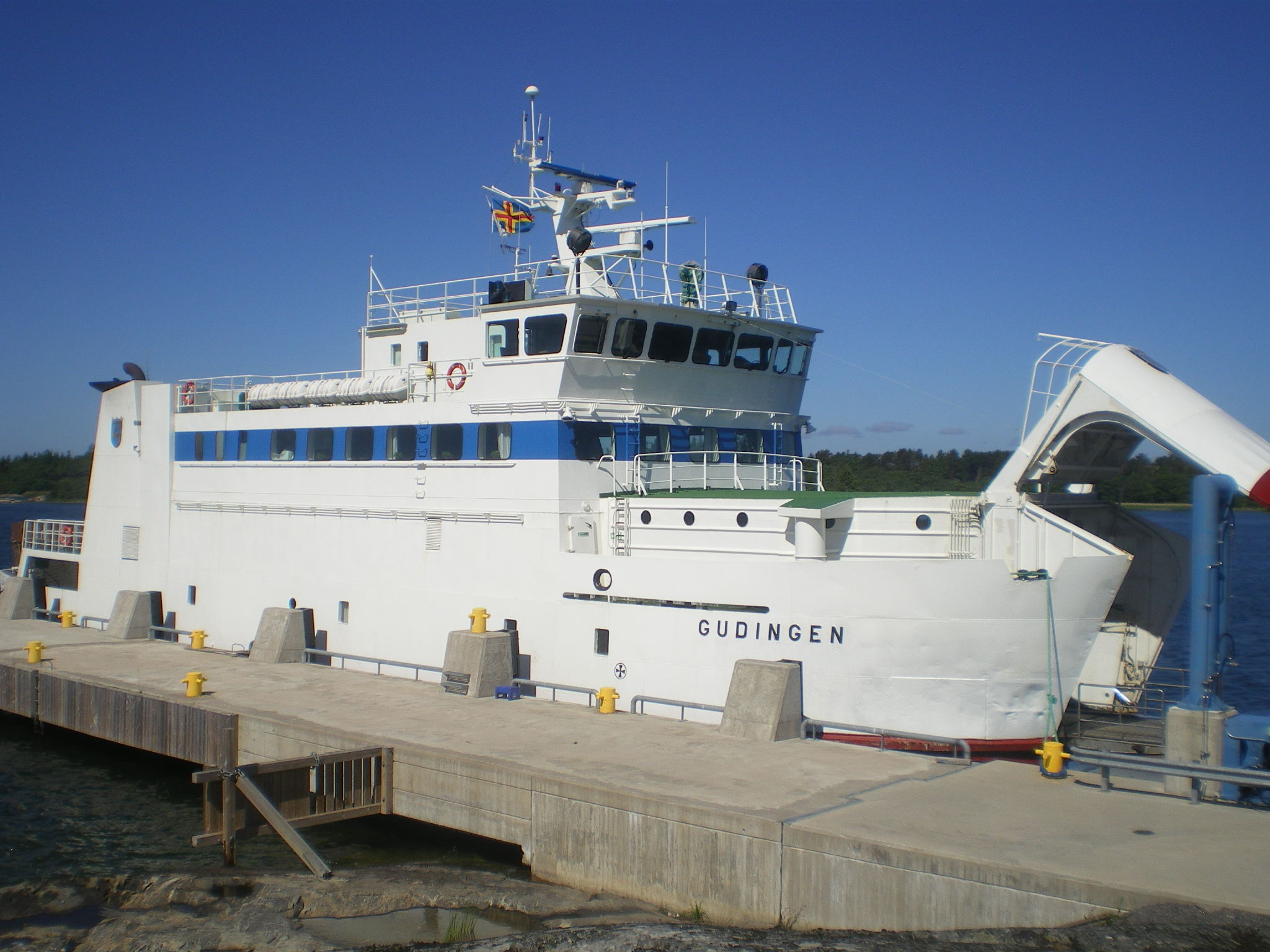
M/S Gudingen at Kökar

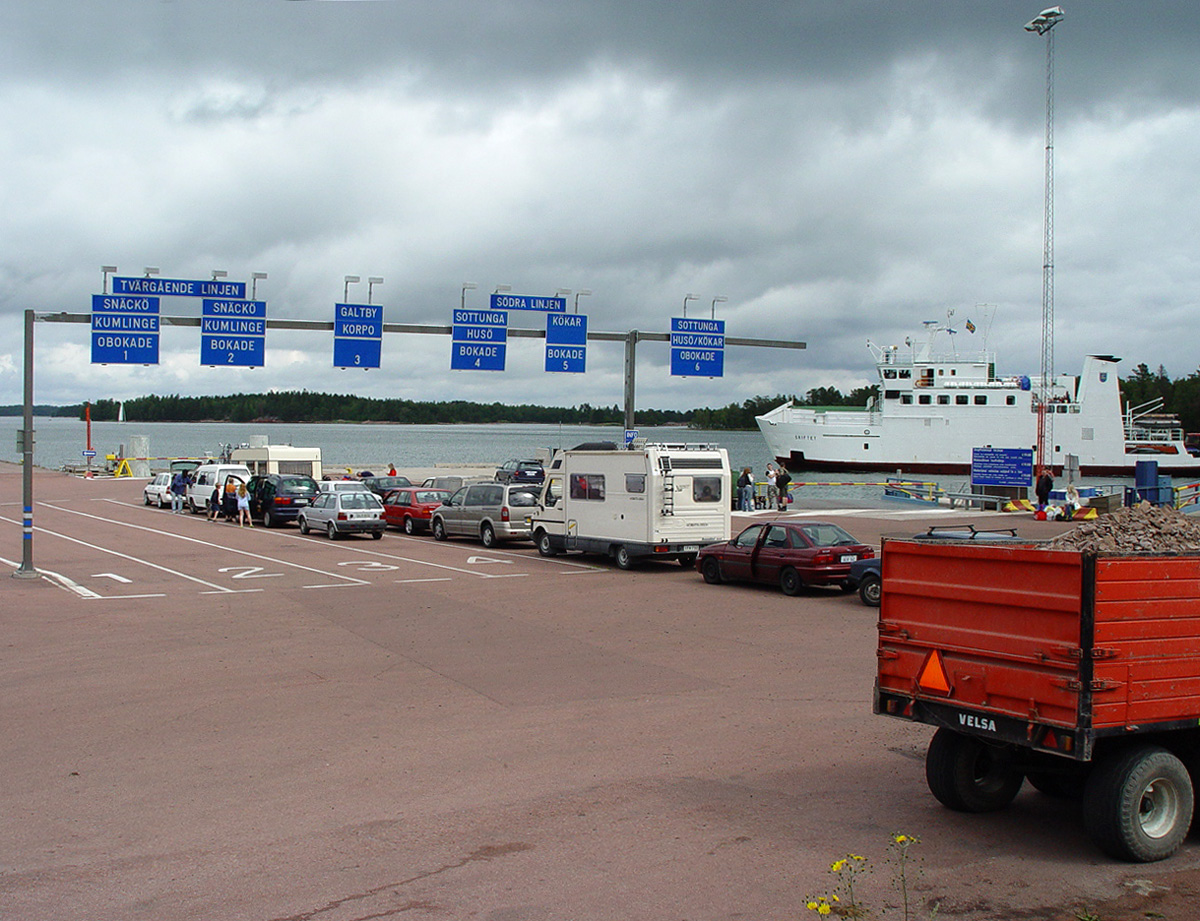
Långnäs, Lumparland

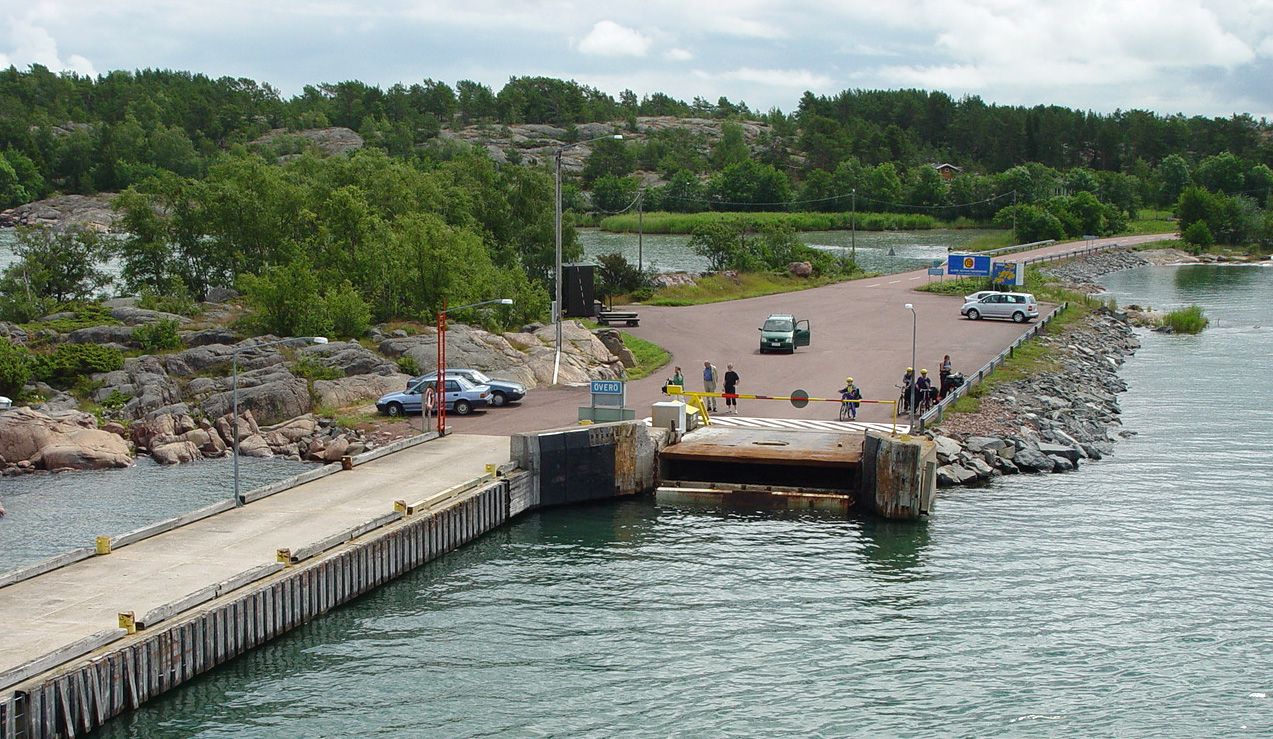
Överö, Föglö

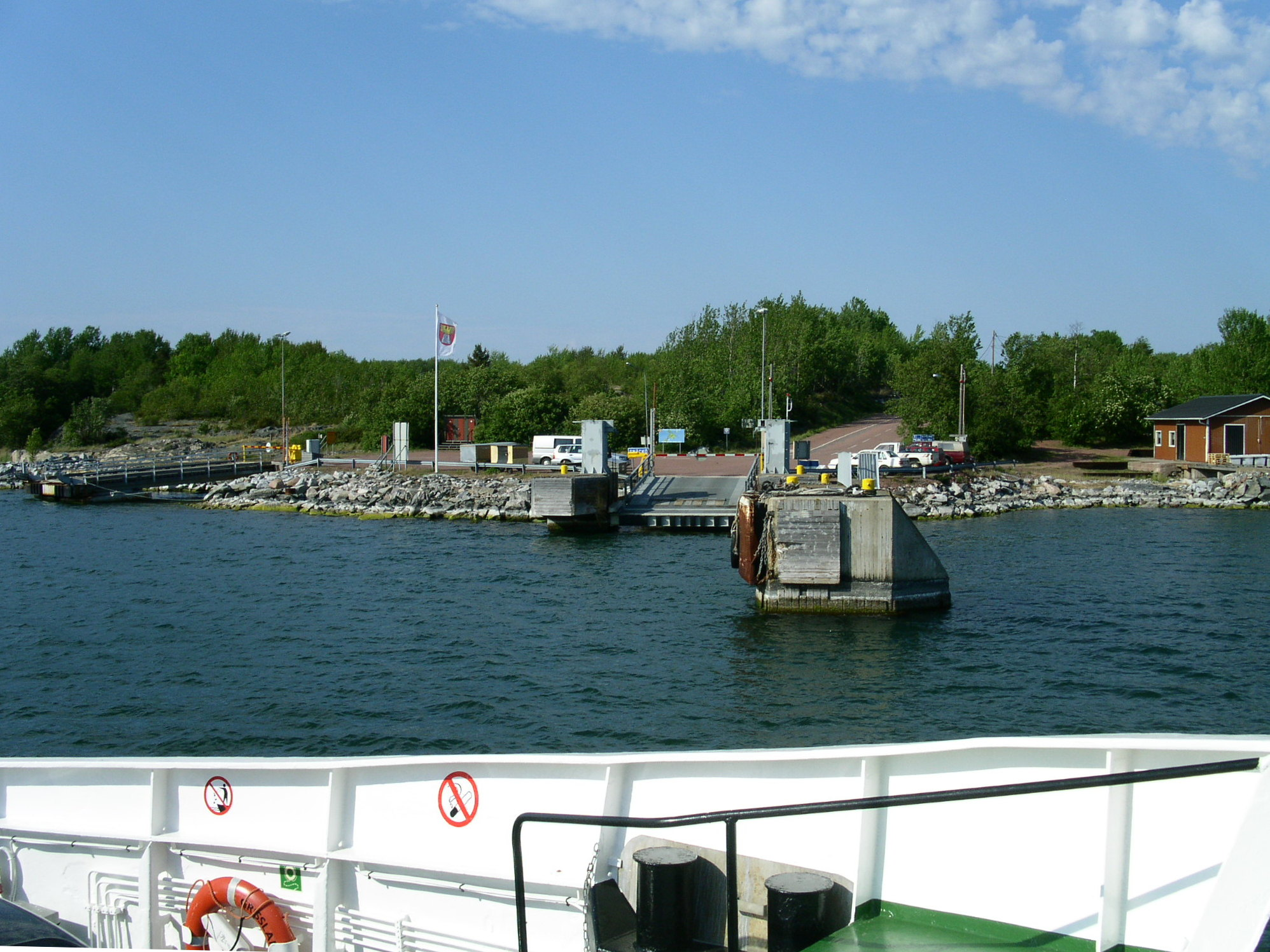
Snäckö, Kumlinge

== See also ==
- Transport on the Åland Islands
