= Lappo, Åland =

Lappo
- Village
- Location of Lappo Lappo (Finland)
- Coordinates: 60°19′0″N 20°59′30″E
- Country: Finland
- Region: Åland
- Municipality: Brändö
- Time zone: UTC+2 (EET)
  - Summer (DST): UTC+3 (EEST)

Lappo is an island and village located in the municipality of Brändö in Åland, Finland. It is one of the 12 villages in the municipality.

Lappo is 8 square kilometer island and it has approximately 35 inhabitants. Nevertheless, the village houses a convenience store, guest harbor, museum, restaurant, gas station, disc golf course and guesthouse. Industries: Tourism, fish farming, agriculture, ferry traffic.

Those who enter Lappo can go by ferry to Torsholma and Asterholma in the same municipality, as well as to the municipalities of Kumlinge and Vårdö as well as Fasta Åland. From the ferry anchorage in the southwest, a cable ferry goes to the neighboring village of Björkö (Vårdö-Enklinge-Kumlinge-Lappo-Torsholma).

Historically, the three villages Lappo, Björkö, Asterholma made up the area "Björköbol", the same area that today has the postal address 22840 Lappo.

== History ==
Lappo has been populated since the 13th or at the latest the 14th century. About Lappo's early history, it witnesses the so-called The Lapp ring, a Roman ring that was found on the island in the 1930s and is now on display at the Åland Museum. Later, the old postal route between Sweden and Finland went over Lappo and on to Kumlinge in the south and Torsholma in the north. In the 19th century, the villagers began to take an interest in culture and education. In 1882, the oldest public library on Åland was founded in Lappo, Lappo school was founded in 1887, Lappo Ungdomsförening in 1895, Lappo Andelsbank in 1925 and Lappo Handelslag in 1941. The youth association's clubhouse Klockkulla, built in 1931, was originally designed by Lars Sonck.

== Sites of interest ==
The village's harbor Finnvik has a popular guest harbor with room for 90 boats. From the guest harbor it is only a stone's throw from the shop, the restaurant and the Archipelago Museum with its forge.

== Notable people ==
- Veronica Thörnroos (born 1962), politician, premier of Åland
