= Hammarland =

Municipality in Åland, Finland

- Municipality
- Hammarlands kommun
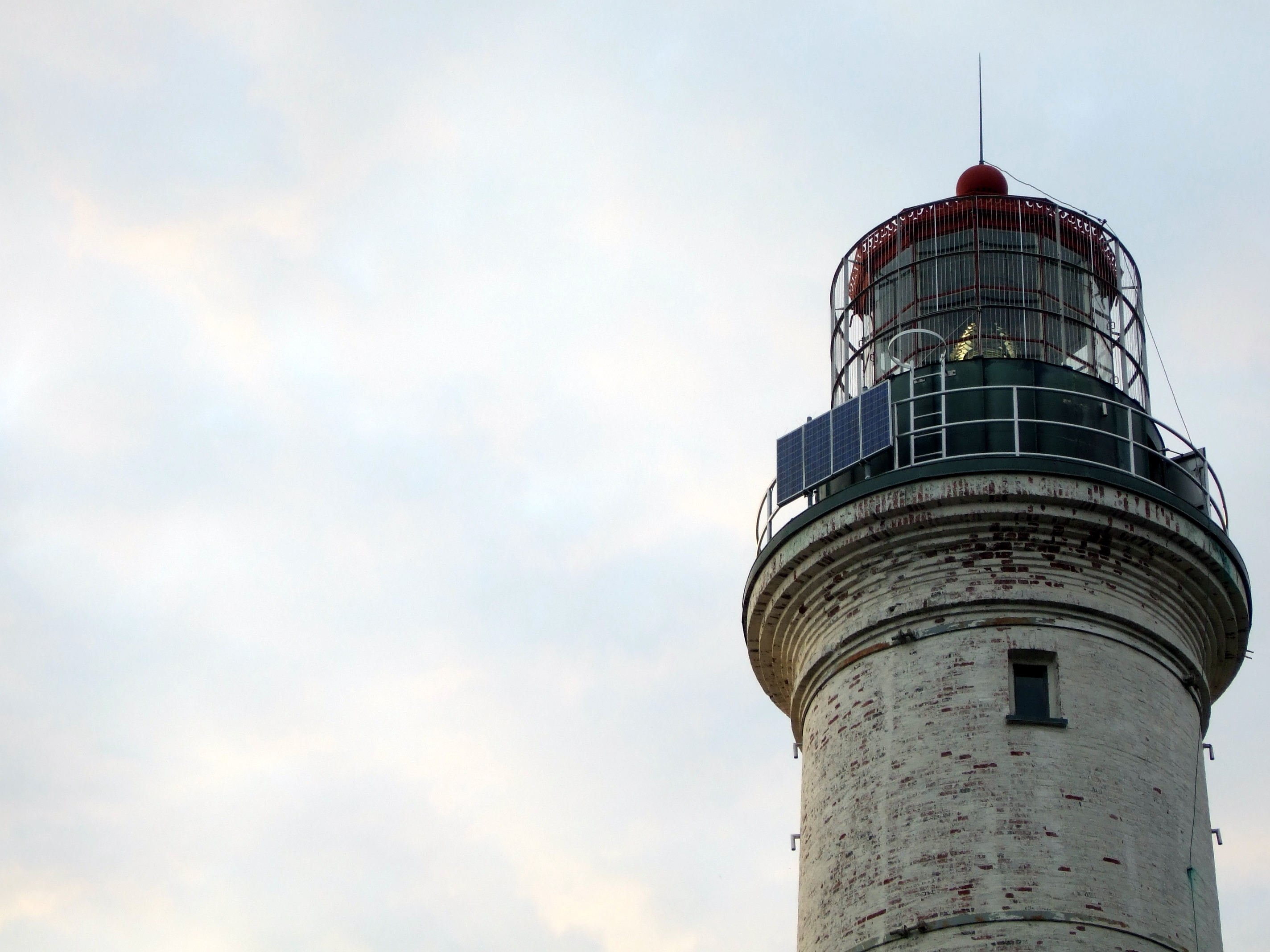
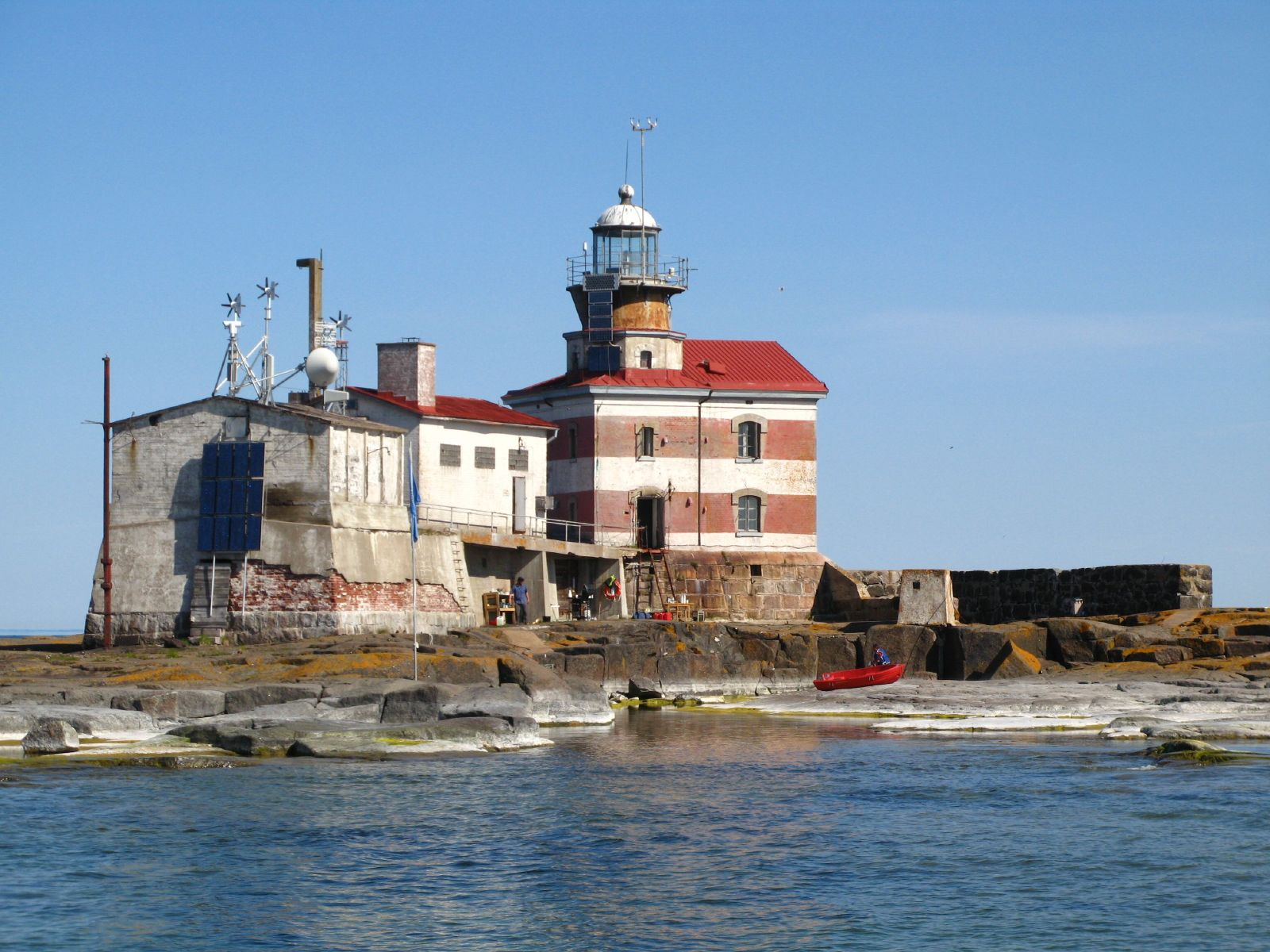
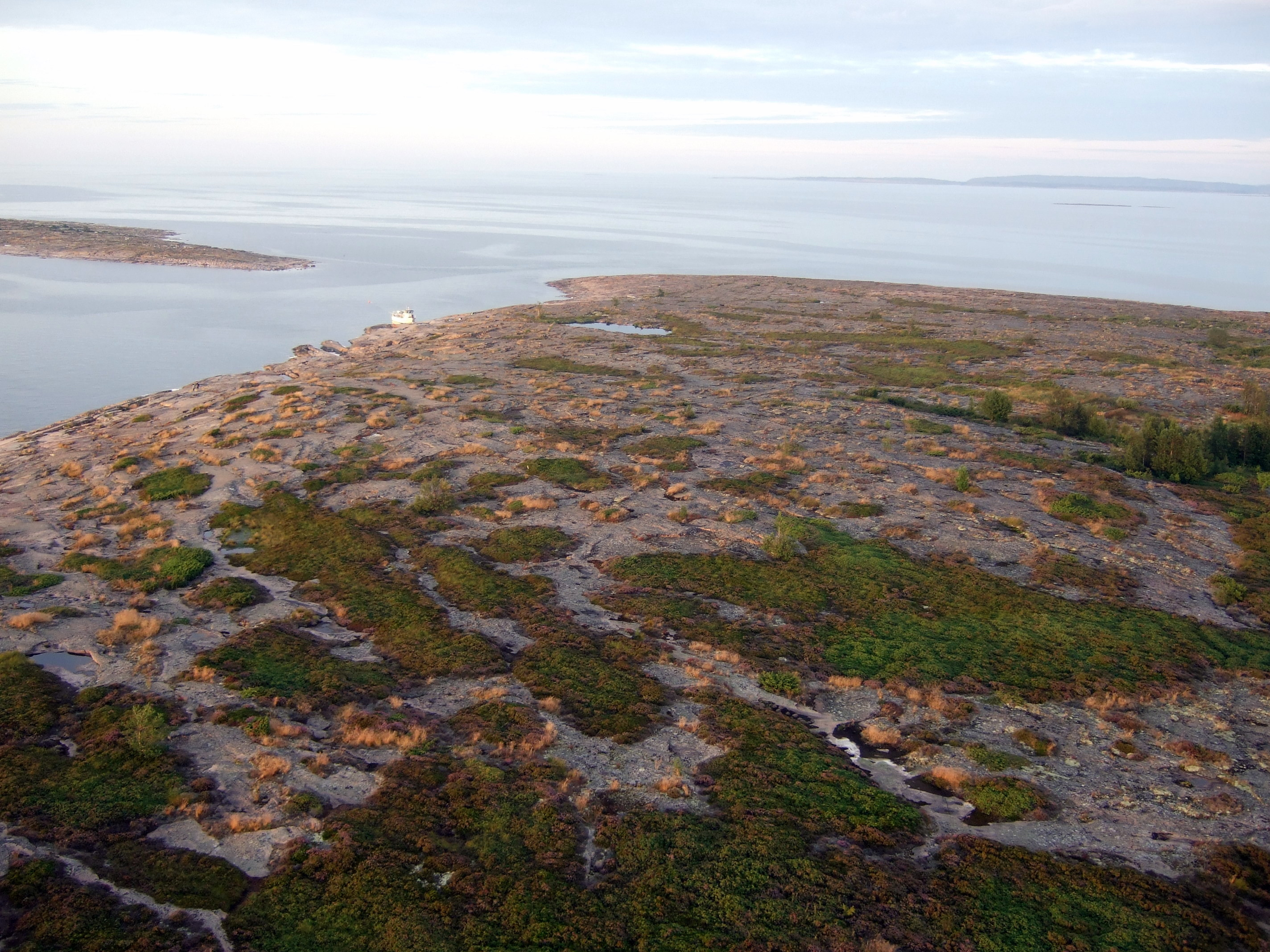
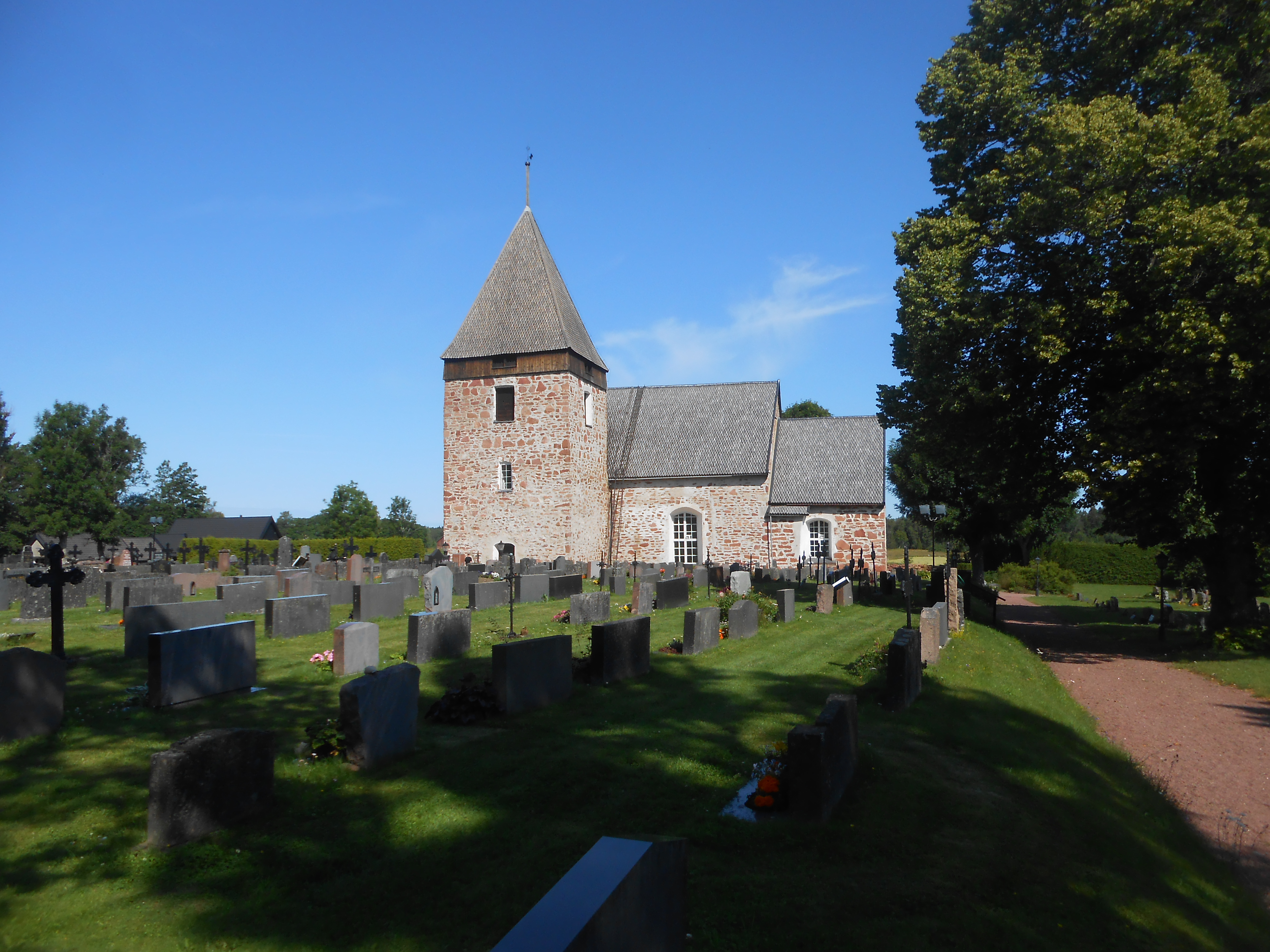

- Coat of arms

- Location of Hammarland in Finland

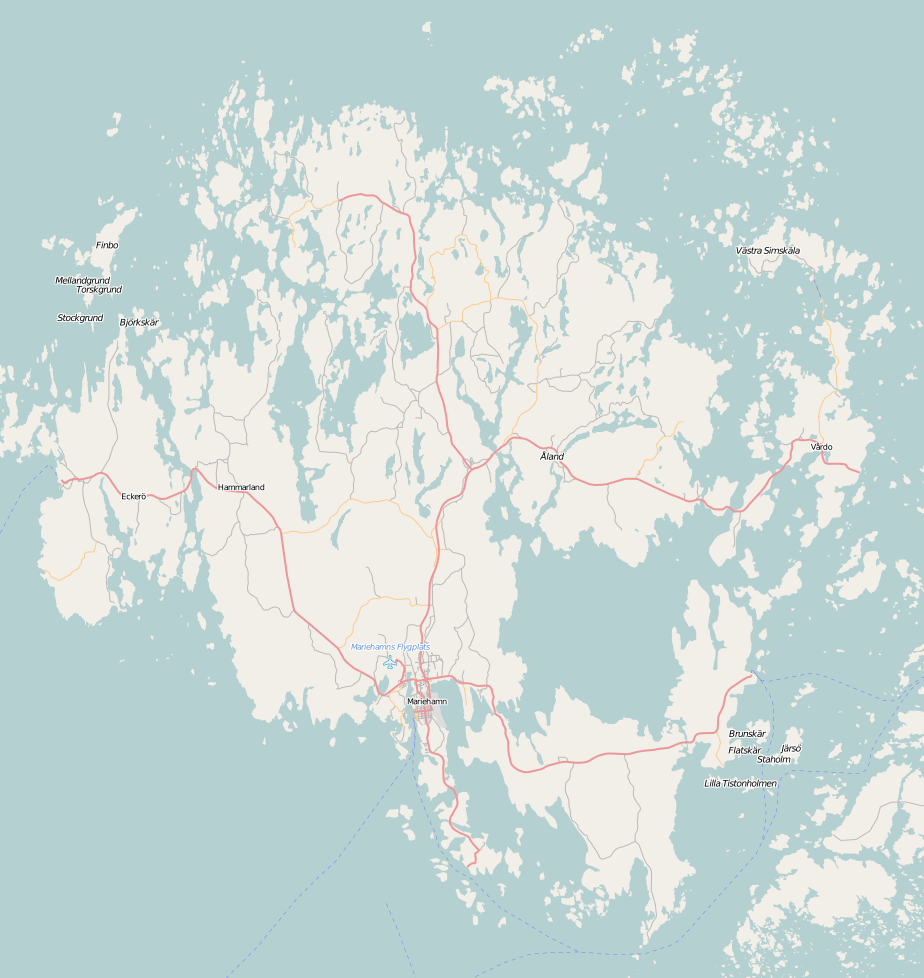
- Location in Åland
- Coordinates: 60°13′N 019°44′E
- Country: Finland
- Region: Åland
- Sub-region: Countryside

Government
  - Municipal manager: Kurt Carlsson

Area (2018-01-01)
  - Total: 1,224.17 km^{2} (472.65 sq mi)
  - Land: 138.55 km^{2} (53.49 sq mi)
  - Water: 1,084.84 km^{2} (418.86 sq mi)
  - Rank: 285th largest in Finland

Population (2025-12-31)
  - Total: 1,644
  - Rank: 276th largest in Finland
  - Density: 11.87/km^{2} (30.7/sq mi)

Population by native language
  - Swedish: 89.7% (official)
  - Finnish: 2.9%
  - Others: 7.4%

Population by age
  - 0 to 14: 17.7%
  - 15 to 64: 60.2%
  - 65 or older: 22.1%
- Time zone: UTC+02:00 (EET)
  - Summer (DST): UTC+03:00 (EEST)
- Website: www.hammarland.ax

Hammarland is a municipality of Åland, an autonomous region of Finland. Its entire population of 1,644 people (31 December 2025) speak Swedish, with 90% having it as their first language (31 December 2008). Hammarland is known for its historic church, considered one of the mother churches of Åland.

== Geography ==
Hammarland has a total area of 1,224.17 square kilometres (472.65 sq mi), of which 1,084.84 km^{2} (418.86 sq mi) is water and only 138.55 square kilometres (53.49 sq mi) is land. Märket, the westernmost point of Finland, is an exclave of Hammarland.

== Demographics ==
The municipality has a population of 1,644 (31 December 2025), with a population density of 11.87 inhabitants per square kilometre (30.7/sq mi).

The municipality is unilingually Swedish. As of 31 December 2008, 90% of its population spoke Swedish as their first language, making Hammarland one of the municipalities with the highest percentage of Swedish speakers in Finland.

== Church ==
The Hammarland Church is a historic building located on an old postal road in the municipality's north, near a small lake connected to a bay and the sea. It is consecrated to Saint Catherine of Alexandria and is considered one of the mother churches of Åland.

Constructed from local red granite, known as rapakivi, the church features a stepped skyline composed of three distinct levels. The highest point is a pyramidal tower built against the western section of the nave's southern wall. The nave itself forms the second-highest structure, while the lowest part is a narrowing chancel to the east, constructed against the nave's original eastern wall. There are small stones in the nave, with larger granite slabs framing the corners. A simple stepped socle runs along the base of the nave, except for a short stretch on the southern side. The church is characterised by large, roughly hewn windows, and the south façade of the nave shows clear evidence of later modifications.

== Transportation ==
The main road of Hammarland is Highway 1 between Mariehamn and Eckerö.
