= Brändö =

- Municipality
- Brändö kommun
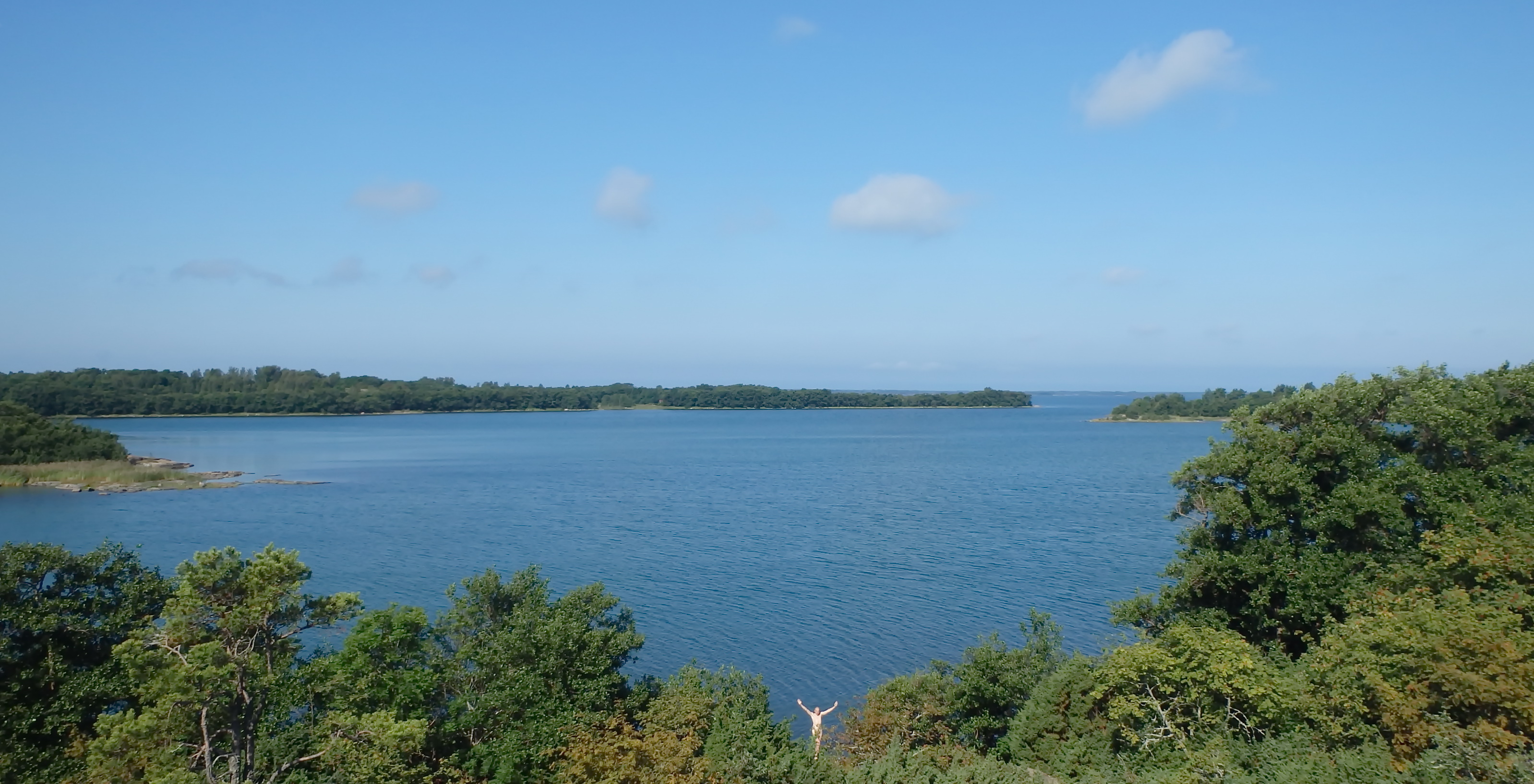
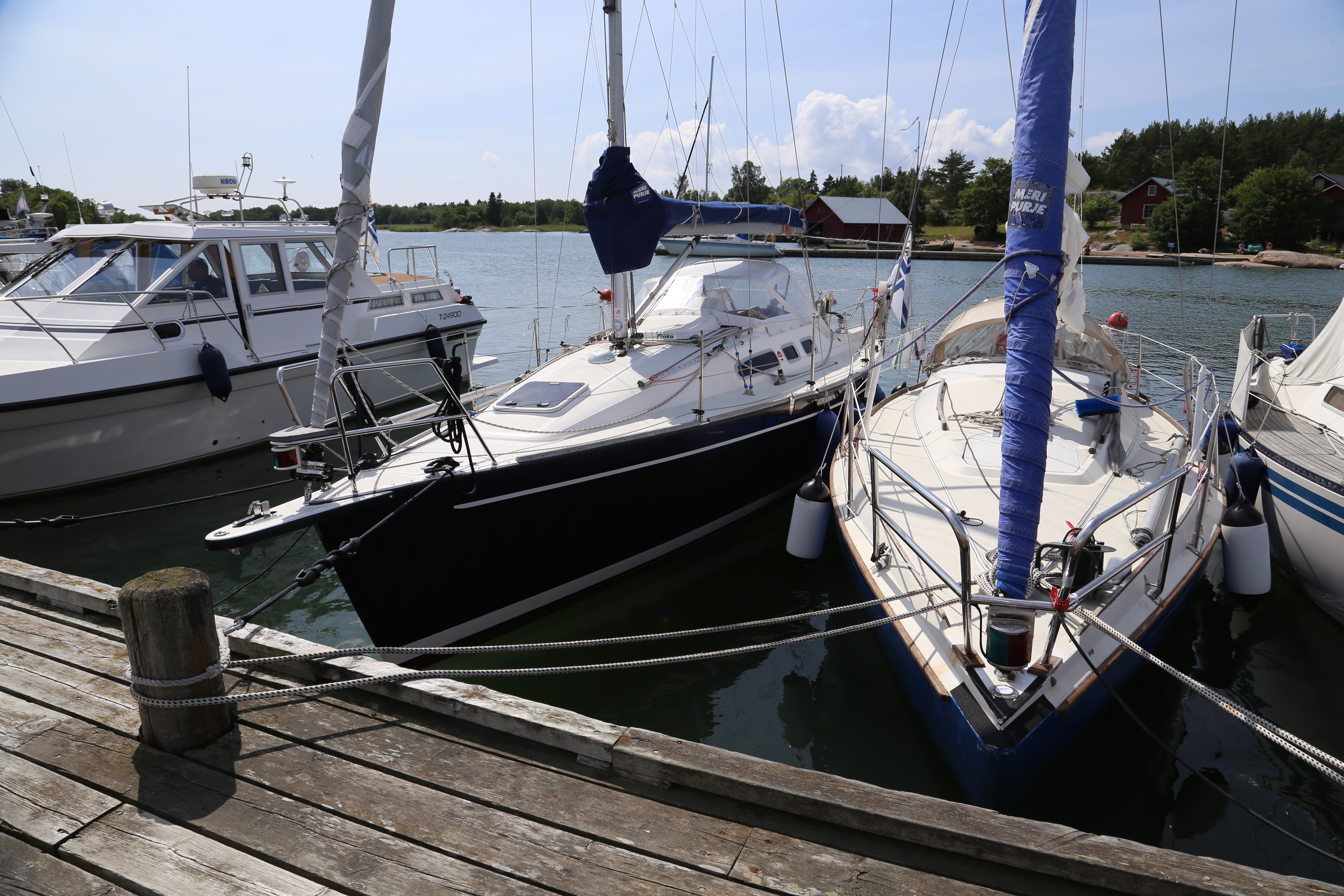
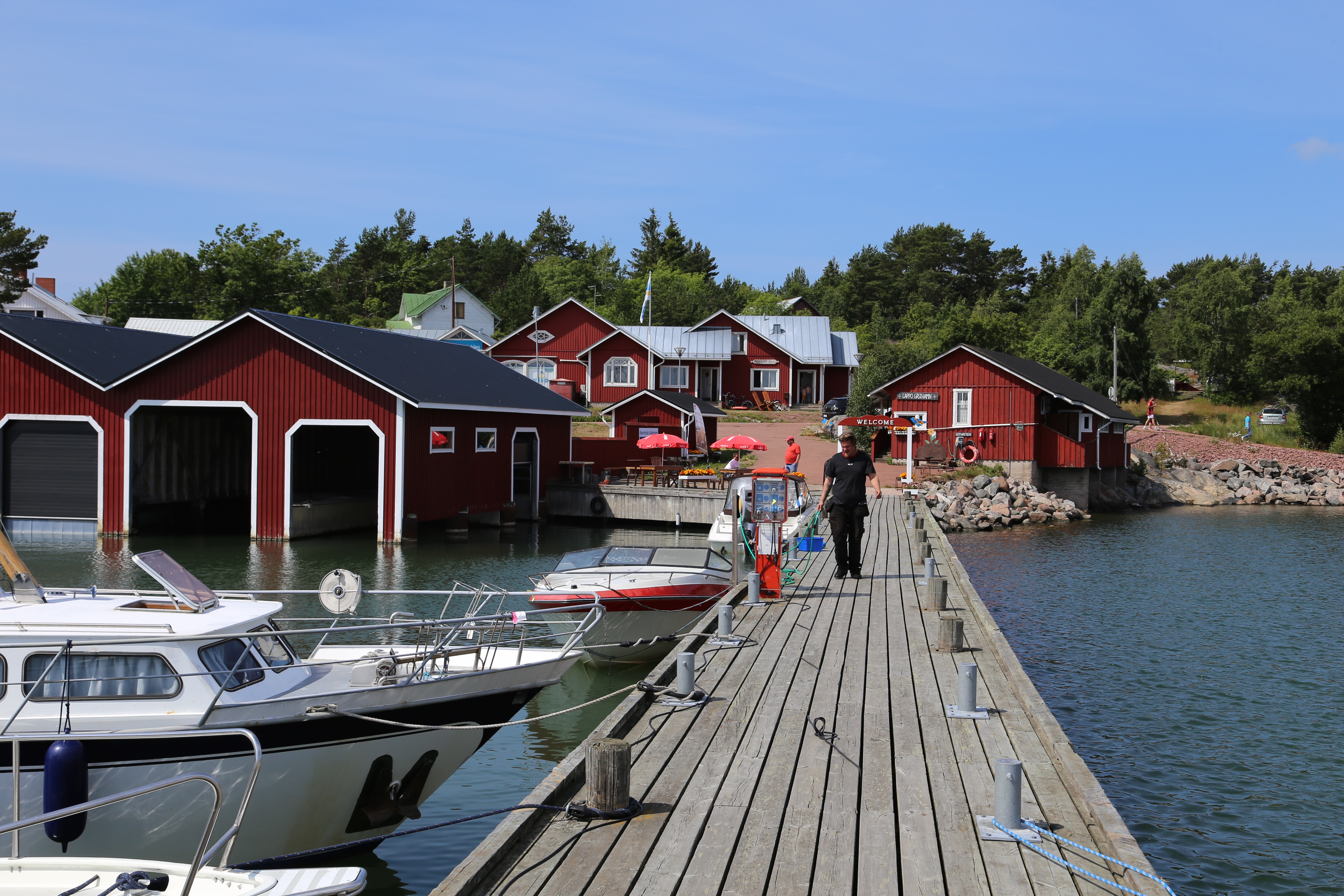
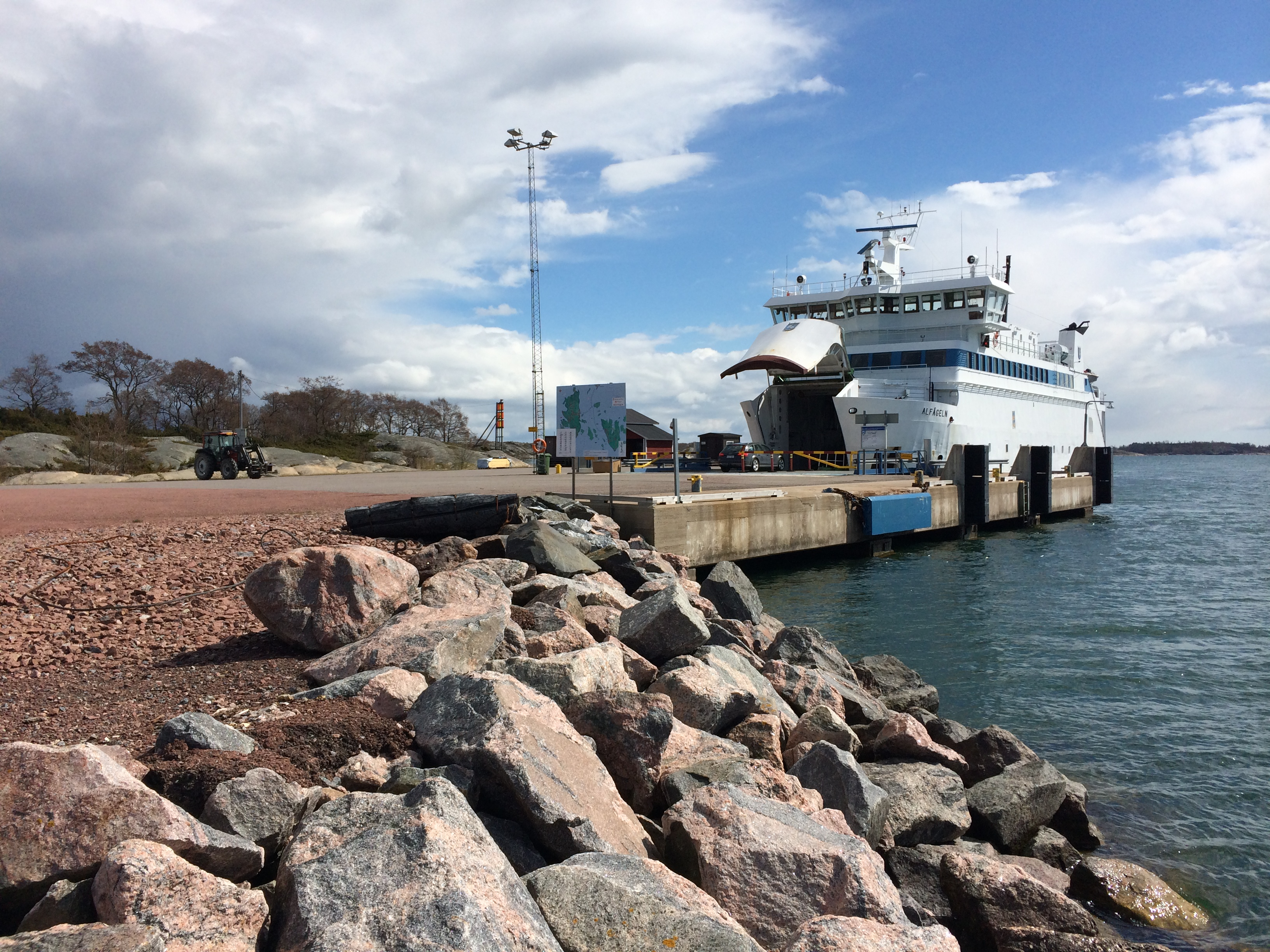
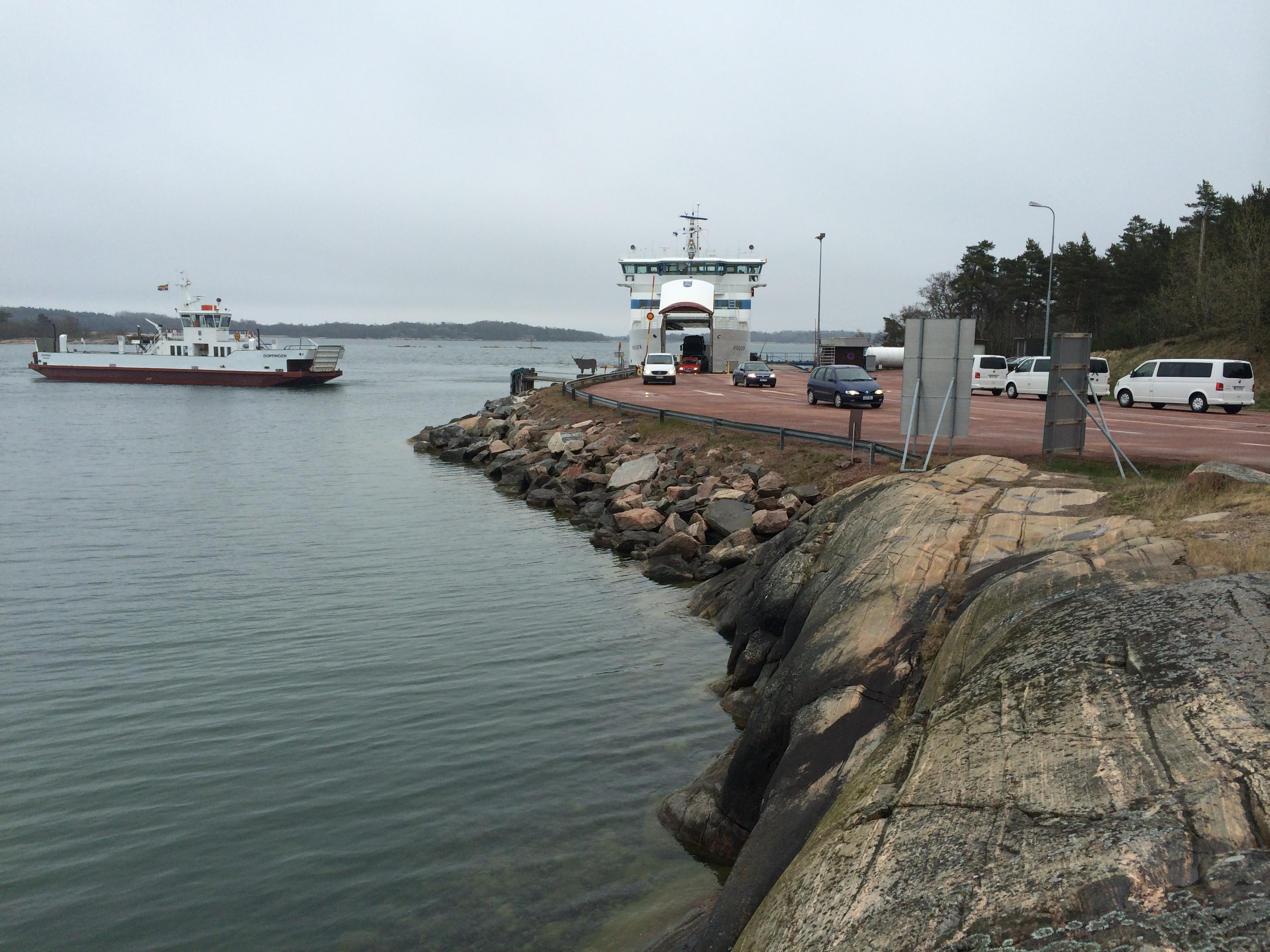

- Coat of arms

- Location of Brändö in Finland

- Location in Åland
- Coordinates: 60°24′42″N 21°2′42″E
- Country: Finland
- Region: Åland
- Sub-region: Archipelago
- Charter: 1866

Government
  - Municipal manager: John Wrede

Area (2018-01-01)
  - Total: 1,643.21 km^{2} (634.45 sq mi)
  - Land: 108.18 km^{2} (41.77 sq mi)
  - Water: 1,540.41 km^{2} (594.76 sq mi)
  - Rank: 296th largest in Finland

Population (2025-12-31)
  - Total: 430
  - Rank: 304th largest in Finland
  - Density: 3.97/km^{2} (10.3/sq mi)

Population by native language
  - Swedish: 72.6% (official)
  - Finnish: 19.3%
  - Others: 8.1%

Population by age
  - 0 to 14: 8.9%
  - 15 to 64: 58.1%
  - 65 or older: 33%
- Time zone: UTC+02:00 (EET)
  - Summer (DST): UTC+03:00 (EEST)
- Website: www.brando.ax/english/

Brändö is an island municipality of Åland, Finland. Characteristics of Brändö are the numerous assembly of islands and islets, most important of which are linked by bridges and causeways. The municipality has a population of 430 (31 December 2025) and covers an area of 1,643.21 square kilometres (634.45 square miles) of which 1,540.41 km^{2} (594.76 sq mi) is water. The population density is 3.97 inhabitants per square kilometre (10.3/sq mi). The municipality is unilingually Swedish and 72.6% of the population are Swedish speakers.

== Geography ==
=== Villages ===
In 1967, Brändö had 12 legally recognized villages (henkikirjakylät):

- Asterholma
- Baggholma
- Björnholma
- Brändö
- Fiskö
- Hullberga
- Jurmo
- Korsö
- Lappo
- Porsskär
- Torsholma
- Åva

== Demographics ==
In 2020, 8.9% of the population of Brändö was under the age of 15, 58.1% were aged 15 to 64, and 33.0% were over the age of 65. The average age was 52.2, over the national average of 43.4 and regional average of 43.8. Speakers of Swedish made up 71.7% of the population and speakers of Finnish made up 18.9%, while the share of speakers of foreign languages was 9.4%. Foreign nationals made up 9.8% of the total population. Brändö has no urban areas.

The chart below, describing the development of the total population of Brändö from 1975 to 2020, encompasses the municipality's area as of 2021.

Historical population

Year	Pop.	±% p.a.
1975	565	—
1980	550	−0.54%
1985	528	−0.81%
1990	529	+0.04%
1995	548	+0.71%

Year	Pop.	±% p.a.
2000	514	−1.27%
2005	519	+0.19%
2010	488	−1.22%
2015	470	−0.75%
2020	449	−0.91%

Source: Statistics Finland

Håkan Skogsjö has documented the permanently residing population of Brändö from the 17th century to the present, covering the history of the municipality as a whole, its individual hamlets, down to each original farmstead and the families who lived there.

== Economy ==
In 2018, 20.9% of the workforce of Brändö worked in primary production (agriculture, forestry and fishing), 11.5% in secondary production (e.g. manufacturing, construction and infrastructure), and 58.8% in services. In 2019, the unemployment rate was 1.0%, and the share of pensioners in the population was 36.2%.

The five largest employers in Brändö in 2019 were as follows:

1. Brändö Lax Ab, 35 employees
2. Municipality of Brändö, 32 employees
3. Brändö Bygg Ab, 8 employees
4. Brändö Andelshandel, 5 employees
5. Brändö Fritidsservice Ab, 5 employees

== Interesting facts ==
The Brändö municipality was sponsor of the Ukraine men's national bandy team at the 2017 Bandy World Championship.
