= Transport in Åland =

Transport infrastructure and services in Åland

Transport in Åland covers air, road, and sea connections that link the islands with each other and with mainland Finland and Sweden. Maritime transport is the main form of travel and trade due to the archipelago’s geography.

== Air transport ==
Mariehamn Airport provides regular flights operated by Nordic Regional Airlines on behalf of Finnair. The island of Kumlinge also has a small airfield and a helipad used mainly for charter and emergency flights.

== Road transport ==
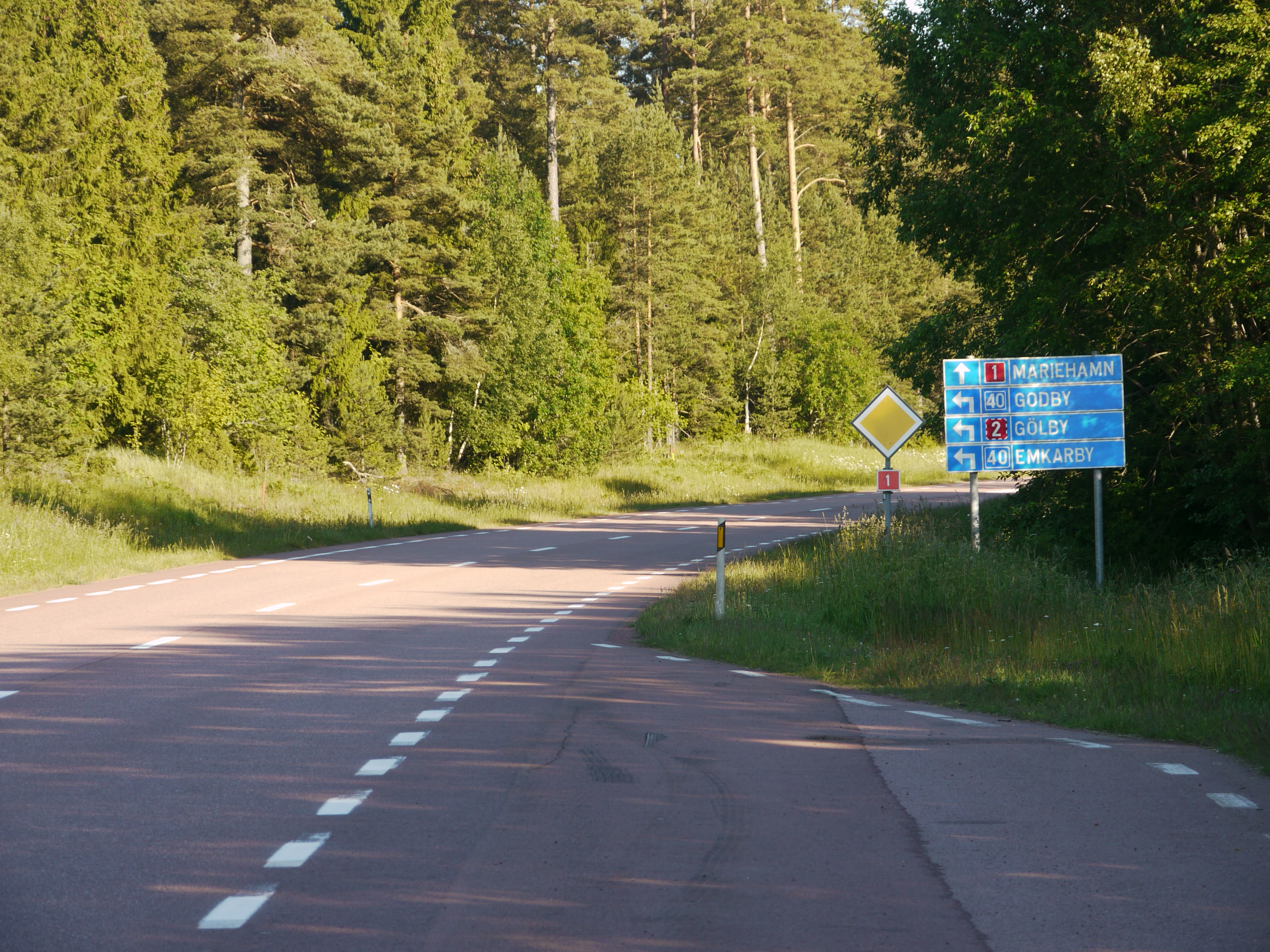
Highway 1 (Huvudväg 1) between Eckerö and Mariehamn

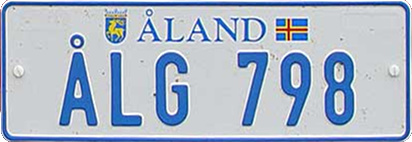
Vehicle registration plate with ÅL prefix

The islands have a compact road network with separate cycle lanes on several main roads (huvudvägar). Public buses, operated by Ålandstrafiken, connect the main population centres and coordinate with ferry timetables. Vehicles registered in Åland use number plates beginning with "ÅL". Many local roads are surfaced with red granite.

== Maritime transport ==
Maritime transport connects Åland with surrounding countries and between its own islands. Ferries also provide access to duty-free trade under Åland’s special EU tax status defined by the Åland Protocol.

=== International routes ===
Major ferry operators serving Åland include:

- Viking Line
- Silja Line
- Tallink

Ferries stop at Mariehamn and Långnäs on routes linking Finland, Sweden, and Estonia.

=== Inter-island and mainland services ===
- Ålandstrafiken operates ferries between the islands and to the Finnish mainland, including ports at Galtby in Pargas and Vuosnainen in Kustavi.
- Eckerö Linjen connects Berghamn in Eckerö with Grisslehamn in Sweden.
- Finnlines runs services between Naantali and Kapellskär via Långnäs.
