= Index of Åland Islands–related articles =

List of topics related to the Åland Islands

This page lists topics related to the autonomous region of Åland.

== 0–9 ==
- 1974 Women's Nordic Football Championship
- 1994 Ålandic European Union membership referendum

== A ==
- Åland
- Åland Islands dispute
- Åland Islands
- Åland Post
- Åland Regional Assembly
- Åland State Provincial Office
- Åland Swedish
- Åland's Autonomy Day
- Archipelago Sea

== B ==
- Baltic Sea
- Battle of Bomarsund
- Bibliography of the Åland Islands
- Bomarsund, Åland

== C ==
- Coat of arms of Åland
- Crimean War
- Culture of Åland

== D ==
- Demographics of Åland
- Disciple (film)

== E ==
- Economy of Åland
- Education in Åland
- Eckerö

== F ==
- Fasta Åland
- Flag of Åland
- Föglö
- Football in Åland

== G ==
- Geography of Åland
- Geta, Åland
- Government of Åland
- Gulf of Bothnia

== H ==
- History of Åland
- Homeschooling in Åland

== I ==
- IFK Mariehamn
- Index of Finland-related articles
- International Island Games Association

== J ==
- Jomala

== K ==
- Kastelholm Castle
- Kökar

== L ==
- Languages of Åland
- Lantråd
- Långnäs

== M ==
- Mariehamn
- Märket
- Municipalities of Åland
- Music of Åland

== N ==
- Nordic Council

== P ==
- Parliament of Åland
- Paf (company)
- Politics of Åland
- Pommern (ship)
- Province of Åland
- Public holidays in Åland

== R ==
- Religion in Åland
- Right of domicile (Åland)

== S ==
- Sea of Åland
- Self-Government Day of Åland
- Small European Postal Administration Cooperation
- Sport in Åland
- St. Olaf's Church, Jomala
- Sweden

== T ==
- Transport on the Åland Islands
- Treaty of Fredrikshamn
- Treaty of Paris (1856)

== U ==
- United Nations and the Åland dispute
- University of Applied Sciences, Åland

== V ==
- Vårdö

== W ==
- Wiklöf Holding Arena
- World War II and Åland

== See also ==
- Lists of country-related topics – similar indexes for other countries
