= Outline of Åland =

Overview of and topical guide to the Åland Islands

Flag of Åland

Coat of arms of Åland

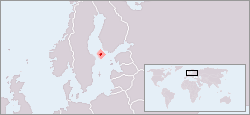
Location of Åland in the Baltic Sea

Political map of the Åland Islands

The following is an outline of and topical guide to the Åland Islands:

Åland – an autonomous, demilitarized, Swedish-speaking region and historical province of Finland, located in the Baltic Sea at the entrance to the Gulf of Bothnia. Governance is primarily handled by the Government of Åland, separate from Finland’s central administration.

== General reference ==
- Common English name: Åland or the Åland Islands
- Official English name: Autonomous State of Åland, Republic of Finland
- ISO code: AX
- Top-level domain: .ax
- Subdivision code: FI-01
- Currency: Euro (EUR)
- Etymology: Name of Åland

== Geography of Åland ==
Topographic map of Åland

- Åland is an archipelago of over 6,500 islands
- Location:
  - Northern Hemisphere, Eastern Hemisphere
  - Europe, Northern Europe
  - Baltic Sea
- Population (2023): ~30,500
- Total land area: ~1,580 km²
- Capital: Mariehamn
- Largest island: Fasta Åland

=== Administrative divisions ===
Åland is divided into 16 municipalities:

- Brändö
- Eckerö
- Finström
- Föglö
- Geta
- Hammarland
- Jomala
- Kumlinge
- Kökar
- Lemland
- Lumparland
- Mariehamn
- Saltvik
- Sottunga
- Sund
- Vårdö

== Government and politics ==
- Political system: Parliamentary system, autonomous and demilitarized
- Capital: Mariehamn
- Parliament: Parliament of Åland (Lagting)
- Executive: Government of Åland
- Head of government: Lantråd
- Representation in Finland: 1 MP in the Parliament of Finland
- Autonomy governed by: Act on the Autonomy of Åland
- Related international treaty: Åland convention
- Relationship with the EU: Special status in EU

=== Law and military ===
- Åland is demilitarized by treaty
- Local police force under regional control
- Residents are exempt from conscription
- No military forces or bases are present

== History ==
Key periods include:

- Swedish rule (until 1809)
- Russian Empire (1809–1917)
- Åland crisis and League of Nations ruling (1921)
- Autonomy established (1922)
- Status reaffirmed in Finland's EU accession treaty (1995)

== Culture ==
- Language: Swedish (official and sole language)
- National symbols:
  - Flag of Åland
  - Coat of arms of Åland
  - Anthem: Ålänningens sång
- Religion: Mostly Evangelical Lutheran Church of Finland
- Notable heritage sites:
  - Kastelholm Castle
  - Bomarsund, Åland
- Cuisine of Åland
- Museums of Åland:
  - Åland Museum
  - Åland Maritime Museum and Pommern (ship)

== Economy and infrastructure ==
- Major sectors: shipping, trade, tourism, small business, food production
- Local currency: Euro (€)
- Post: Åland Post
- Tax status: separate customs zone from the EU VAT area
- Main port: Western Harbour (Mariehamn)

== Transport ==
- Airports: Mariehamn Airport
- Ferries: Frequent service to Sweden and mainland Finland
- Road: Local highways across Fasta Åland
- Ports: Långnäs, Berghamn (Åland)

== Education ==
- Language of instruction: Swedish
- Institutions:
  - Ålands lyceum
  - Åland Vocational School
  - Åland University of Applied Sciences
  - Alandica Shipping Academy

== Demographics ==
- Population: ~30,500
- Language: Swedish (sole official language)
- 17% of residents have foreign background
- Right of domicile regulates voting rights and property ownership

== Sport ==
- IFK Mariehamn – men's football club
- Åland United – women's football club
- Ålands Fotbollförbund – football association
- Åland Islands national football team (non-FIFA)
- Participates in the Island Games

== See also ==
- Index of Åland-related articles
- List of Åland-related topics
- List of islands by area
- Outline of Finland
- Outline of Europe
- Nordic countries
- Baltic Sea
