= Municipalities of Åland =

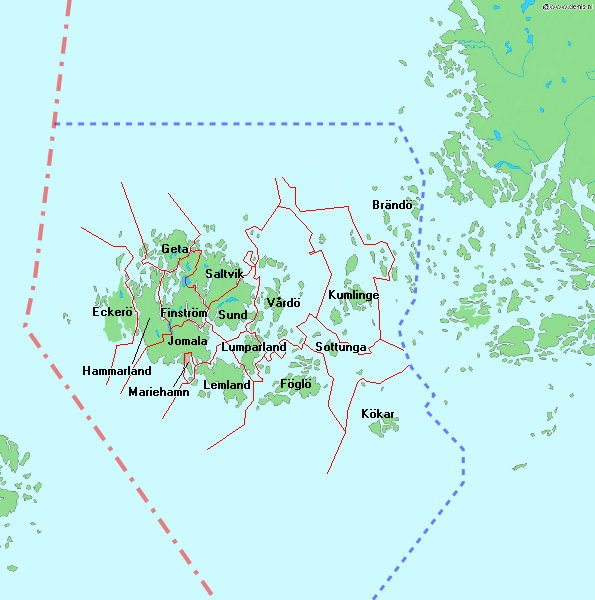
Map of Åland's municipalities

The municipalities of Åland (Swedish: Ålands kommuner) are the sixteen local government units that administer the Åland Islands. Despite being a part of Finland, Åland has a high degree of self-government under the Act on the Autonomy of Åland, with its municipalities managing a wide range of local public services. Swedish is the sole official language in both regional and municipal administration. All public services, including education, are conducted exclusively in Swedish.

The size of Åland’s municipalities varies significantly. Mariehamn, the largest, has a population of 11,898, accounting for over 40% of Åland’s total population, while Sottunga is the smallest in both Åland and in all of Finland with just 103 residents.

== Municipal Elections ==
Each municipality is governed by an elected municipal council, which serves a four-year term. To vote in these elections you must, be at least 18 years old, have the right of domicile, and have been a resident of Åland for the previous year.

== Municipal Responsibilities ==
Municipalities in Åland maintain a wide range of responsibilities, many of which have been regionalised elsewhere in Finland. These include, but not limited to: public buildings and facilities, public transport, economic development, environmental protection, waste management, land use, local infrastructure, and primary, secondary, and adult education.

== Inter-Municipal Cooperation ==
Municipalities cooperate in several areas through municipal associations and jointly owned corporations.

=== Associations ===
- Ålands kommunförbund - Association of Åland Municipalities
- Miljöservice (Mise) - Waste management
- De Gamlas Hem - Old people's home
- Ålands omsorgsförbund - Åland Care Association
- Södra Ålands högstadiedistrikt - South Åland high school
- Norra Ålands högstadiedistrikt - North Åland high school

=== Corporations ===
- Mariehamns Centralantenn Ab - TV and broadband company
- Mariehamns Telefon Ab - Telecom company
- Ålands vatten Ab - Produces drinking water
- Ålands Problemavfall Ab - Handles hazardous waste
- Svinryggens deponi Ab - Landfill
- Fastighets Ab Marstad - Real estate company

== Sub-regions ==
The 16 municipalities are informally grouped into three sub-regions:

- Mariehamn - The capital and only city in Åland.
- The Countryside - Rural municipalities on the main island (Fasta Åland)
- The Archipelago - Municipalities that make up the other islands.

== Municipalities ==
Coat of Arms	Municipality	Code	Sub-region	Population	Land area		Population density	
	Mariehamn	MH	Mariehamn	11,957	11.81 km^{2}	4.6 sq mi	1,012/km^{2}	2,622/sq mi
	Jomala	JM	Countryside	5,817	142.73 km^{2}	55.1 sq mi	41/km^{2}	106/sq mi
	Finström	FN	Countryside	2,625	123.43 km^{2}	47.7 sq mi	21/km^{2}	55/sq mi
	Lemland	LE	Countryside	2,139	113.21 km^{2}	43.7 sq mi	19/km^{2}	49/sq mi
	Saltvik	SV	Countryside	1,802	152.25 km^{2}	58.8 sq mi	12/km^{2}	31/sq mi
	Hammarland	HM	Countryside	1,644	138.55 km^{2}	53.5 sq mi	12/km^{2}	31/sq mi
	Sund	SD	Countryside	1,018	108.21 km^{2}	41.8 sq mi	9/km^{2}	24/sq mi
	Eckerö	EC	Countryside	961	107.72 km^{2}	41.6 sq mi	9/km^{2}	23/sq mi
	Föglö	FG	Archipelago	512	134.77 km^{2}	52.0 sq mi	4/km^{2}	10/sq mi
	Brändö	BR	Archipelago	430	108.18 km^{2}	41.8 sq mi	4/km^{2}	10/sq mi
	Geta	GT	Countryside	512	84.55 km^{2}	32.6 sq mi	6/km^{2}	16/sq mi
	Vårdö	VR	Archipelago	465	101.75 km^{2}	39.3 sq mi	5/km^{2}	12/sq mi
	Lumparland	LU	Countryside	371	36.35 km^{2}	14.0 sq mi	10/km^{2}	26/sq mi
	Kumlinge	KM	Archipelago	271	99.06 km^{2}	38.2 sq mi	3/km^{2}	7/sq mi
	Kökar	KK	Archipelago	211	63.58 km^{2}	24.5 sq mi	3/km^{2}	9/sq mi
	Sottunga	ST	Archipelago	101	28.03 km^{2}	10.8 sq mi	4/km^{2}	9/sq mi

Population data as of: December 31, 2025
Area data as of: January 1, 2018

== See also ==
- Politics of Åland
- Government of Åland
- Parliament of Åland
