= Archipelago (Åland) =

Finnish subregion

Coordinates: 60.4111°N 21.0458°E

Archipelago seutukunta
- Sub-region
- Country: Finland
- Region: Åland

Population (2011)
  - Total: 2,230
- Time zone: UTC+2 (EET)
  - Summer (DST): UTC+3 (EEST)

Archipelago (Swedish: Ålands skärgård) is a subdivision of Åland and one of the sub-regions of Finland.

== Municipalities ==
| Coat of arms | Municipality |
|---|---|
| Brändön vaakuna | Brändö (municipality) |
| Föglön vaakuna | Föglö (municipality) |
| Kumlingen vaakuna | Kumlinge (municipality) |
| Kökarin vaakuna | Kökar (municipality) |
| Sottungan vaakuna | Sottunga (municipality) |
| Vårdön vaakuna | Vårdö (municipality) |
