= Åland pancake =

Variant of oven-baked pancake

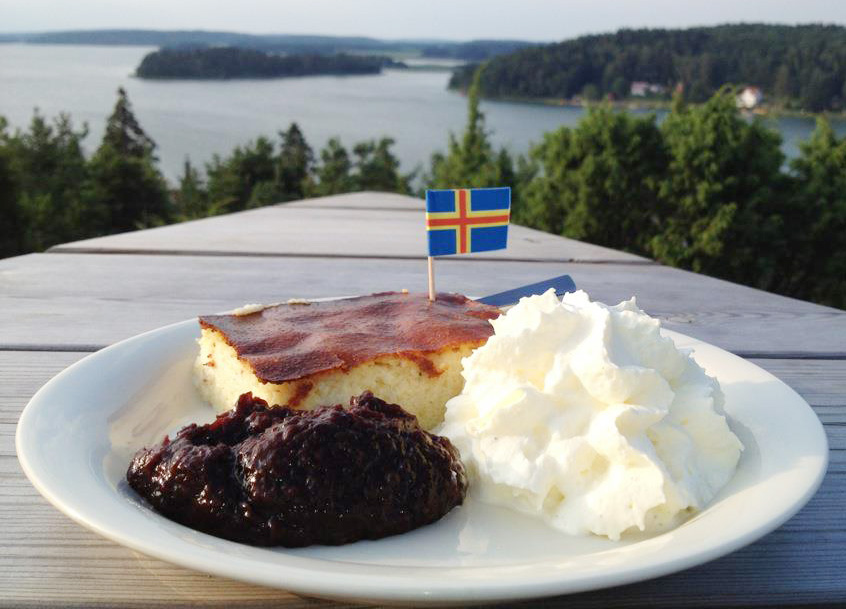
Åland pancake served with whipped cream and prune jam

Åland pancake (Swedish: ålandspannkaka; Finnish: Ahvenanmaan pannukakku) is an oven-baked pancake traditionally made with semolina and flavoured with cardamom. It may be served warm or cold and is typically accompanied by prune jam and whipped cream.

== Origin ==
The Åland pancake is believed to have originated in the Åland archipelago as a practical dish prepared from leftover porridge ingredients. Such preparations allowed households to make use of limited supplies while producing a filling baked dish.

Reliable written sources on its early history are limited, and accounts of its origin are largely based on local tradition.

== Ingredients ==
The standard ingredients include semolina, eggs, cardamom, sugar, and salt. In some variants, semolina is replaced with pudding rice. The pancake is traditionally served with sviskonkräm (prune jam) and whipped cream, known locally in Åland as snömos (literally "snow mash"). Depending on the recipe and accompaniments, the dish may be served either as a dessert or as a sweet snack.

The Åland pancake is closely related to the Gotland pancake, which is made with rice and flavoured with saffron rather than cardamom.

On Åland's Autonomy Day (9 June), Åland pancakes are commonly served during public celebrations in Mariehamn.
