= Telephone numbers in Åland =

Country Code: +358 18 (partial)
International Call Prefix: 00
Trunk Prefix: 0

Telephone numbers in Åland use ranges owned by Finland.

Format: +358 18 XXXXX(X), +358 457 0XX XXXX, +358 457 3XX XXXX and +358 457 5XX XXXX for regional GSM/3G operator Ålands Mobiltelefon (ÅMT). Longer local numbers than five digits are possible (usually with Telia Finland). Dominant operator on the island is the regional company Mariehamns Telefon Ab.

ÅMT has a domestic roaming agreement at no cost to the user with operator Elisa in mainland Finland. This agreement is reciprocal except for Elisa's prepaid customers under the Saunalahti brand. Operator Telia Finland's LTE/3G/GSM network covers both mainland Finland and Åland. The ÅMT numbers are not portable to other mobile operators.

== Allocations ==
Number range	Usage
+358 18 XXX XX	Åland, fixed
+358 18 XX XX XX	Åland, fixed
+358 457 0XX XXXX	ÅMT
+358 457 3XX XXXX	ÅMT
+358 457 5XX XXXX	ÅMT
