= Nicken Rönngren =

Finland-Swedish theatre director

- Born: James Nikolai Rönngren; 2 November 1880; Mariehamn, Åland
- Died: 26 April 1956 (aged 75); Helsinki, Finland
- Occupation: Theatre director
- Years active: 1908–1954

James Nikolai "Nicken" Rönngren (2 November 1880 – 26 April 1956) was a Finland-Swedish theatre director. He was director of Svenska Teatern (the Swedish Theatre) in Helsinki from 1919 to 1954, and is regarded as a central figure in establishing Finland-Swedish as a legitimate language of the stage in Finland. Rönngren viewed the theatre as a cultural institution rather than an ensemble of individual actors, and his guiding principle was a devotion to the Swedish language. In 1947 he was awarded the honorary title of professor.

== Early life and career ==
Rönngren was born on the Åland Islands as the son of shipbroker Algot Valfrid Rönngren and Isabelle Conradson, and was originally a Swedish citizen. As a young man he weighed the choice between "stage or pulpit" and opted for office work, since a career in theatre was considered disreputable in the bourgeois milieu he came from. He worked in England as a correspondent, but studies in English awakened his interest in the spoken word. On returning to Finland he taught English and elocution. Unable to afford university studies, he travelled to Stockholm to take acting lessons from the celebrated actor August Lindberg and served in the Swedish army.

After settling in Helsinki he became a Finnish citizen. He continued his studies in Berlin and Dresden in 1908, and on a government grant in London and Paris in 1910. From the very beginning of his theatre career he travelled widely across Europe to acquaint himself with actor training and theatre practice in different countries, and throughout his career he placed strong emphasis on professional craft alongside his language-policy work. From 1911 until the early 1950s he taught elocution at the University of Helsinki. Recital evenings in Helsinki and Turku and tours of the provinces made him known as a performing artist. Even as theatre director he appeared at major celebrations and was greatly appreciated. The poetry of Gustaf Fröding was his particular passion.

== Director of Svenska Teatern ==
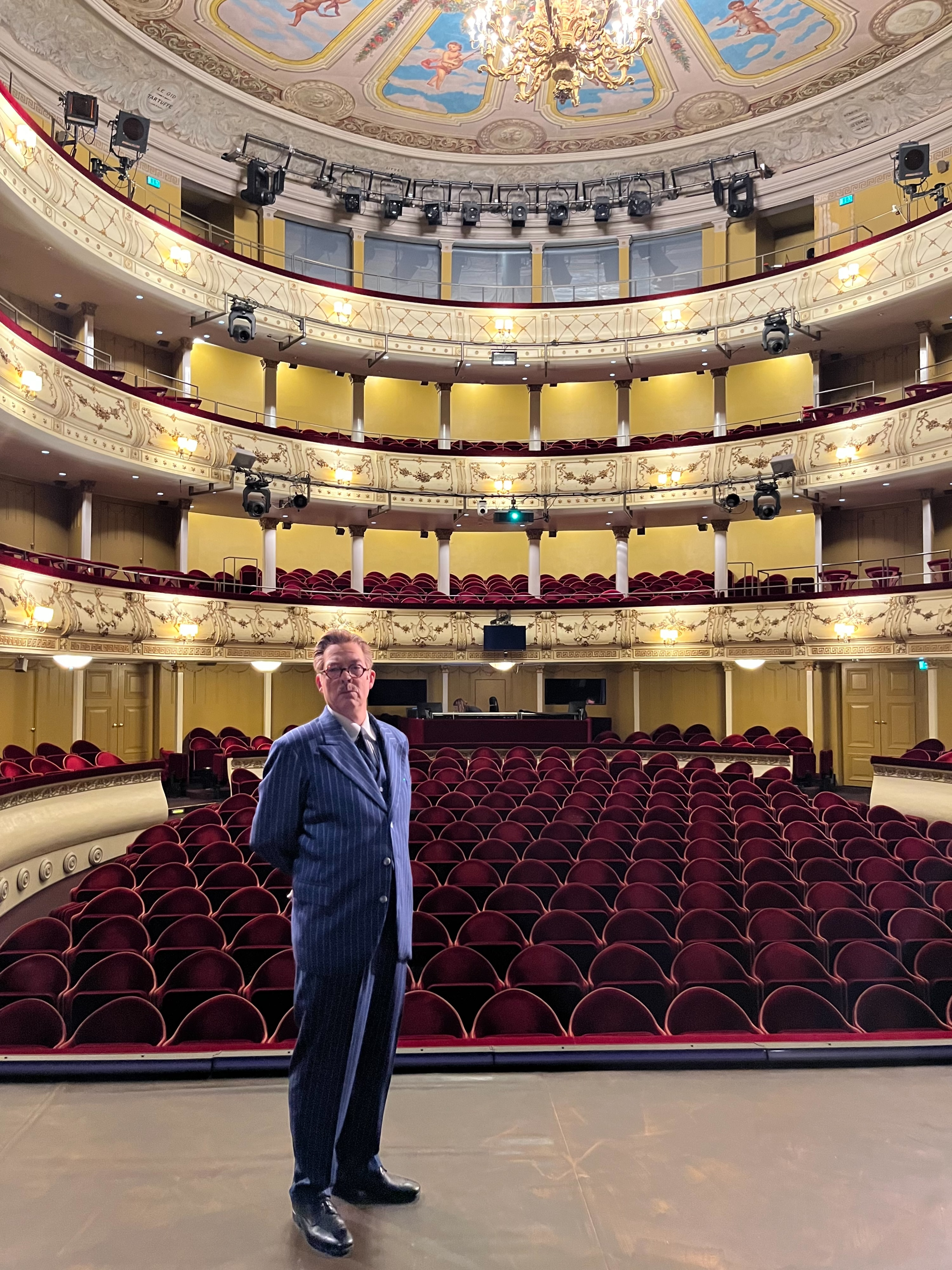
Riko Eklundh as theatre director Nicken Rönngren in the play Amos A at Svenska Teatern, 2025.

Rönngren's career developed in step with the broader movement to establish a home-grown Swedish-language theatre in Finland. In 1908 he became a teacher at Svenska Teatern's acting school, in 1916 secretary of the theatre's board, and a few years later operational director with responsibility for the entire institution. The title of theatre director was introduced only later.

When Svenska Teatern's acting school was founded in early 1908, a Swedish-born actor was appointed teacher of stagecraft and head of the school, but he prioritised his own artistic work and the school's activities were poorly organised. Rönngren, who taught elocution, was particularly concerned about the position of Finland-Swedish on the stage. His efforts to develop a dialect-free indigenous stage language met with prejudice from others on the teaching staff. The situation improved when Rönngren became head of the school in 1910. Gerda Wrede took over the leadership of the acting school in 1931, but it remained subordinate to Svenska Teatern and thus to its director Rönngren.

In practice Rönngren gathered all the reins of Svenska Teatern into his own hands, and in 1919 it was a natural step for him to become operational director, though not without resistance. For most of his long tenure he led Svenska Teatern alone. Only in the first year did he have an artistic director at his side; from 1945 there was a deputy director, first Leo Golowin and then Runar Schauman, who succeeded Rönngren in 1954. By those final years Rönngren had already passed the official retirement age.

Since the 1860s, Svenska Teatern in Helsinki had recruited its actors and directors primarily from Stockholm, and audiences had grown accustomed to stars from Sweden whose manner of speech was regarded as the "correct" stage language. Breaking that norm was no easy matter, but audiences gradually came to accept the Finland-Swedish accent. In the years of nationalisation it was even seen as a patriotic act to become an actor.

Svenska teaterföreningen i Finland (the Swedish Theatre Association of Finland), founded in 1913, marked an important step in the nationalisation of Svenska Teatern. Rönngren was a member of the association's delegation from the outset and led its drama section. A decisive shift occurred at the end of 1915 when the domestic faction won the vote. Rönngren was elected secretary and appointed to a special language committee. The Danish director Adam Poulsen was chosen as artistic director – it was through Rönngren's diplomatic negotiations that Poulsen agreed to come to Helsinki for three years. As a well-known theatre man who was, crucially, not Swedish, Poulsen helped ease the change of course that had been sought.

The nationalisation of the theatre brought it closer to, rather than further from, the other Nordic countries. As an independent theatre director Rönngren was free to negotiate collaborations, and exchange visits between Nordic theatres were arranged frequently. He is described in many accounts as a cultural ambassador. His personal significance for Nordic theatrical cooperation was reflected in the festschrift published for his 70th birthday, to which a substantial number of the leading Nordic theatre figures of the day contributed. Relations with Helsinki's other theatres were warm: Eino Kalima of the Finnish National Theatre and Mia Backman of Kansan Näyttämö (the People's Theatre) enjoyed an easy working relationship with their Finland-Swedish colleague.

== Artistic work ==
As director, Rönngren concentrated primarily on administration and broad collaboration. His artistic contribution lay mainly in programming and casting policy; he directed little, and only in the early part of his career. His most significant production as a director was Bertolt Brecht's The Threepenny Opera, staged in Finland in 1929, shortly after its German premiere. Rönngren's production followed the spirit of the original without copying it directly. The production was praised and was considered the theatrical highlight of the season.

Rönngren had originally considered a career as a performer but felt himself "too large and too ugly" to be an actor. The combination of a fine eye for theatre and a head for finance made him a formidable theatre director. As director he took pride in the fame his actors achieved. One actor particularly close to Rönngren was Erik Lindström, whose portrayal of Hamlet won recognition across the Nordic countries. In 1933, however, the actors submitted a written complaint about their director, which Rönngren experienced as a grave injustice, since his entire work had been aimed at their benefit. He took an interest in the ideas of the younger generation, even when they did not accord with his own view of theatre. The experimental productions directed by Vivica Bandler remained alien to him.

Rönngren was tall, loud, and dominant, yet in his own way also unassuming, sensitive, and at times even shy. Karl-August Fagerholm, a prominent Finnish politician and long-time acquaintance, jokingly described him as a "great theatre troll". He was a convivial companion but a strict and demanding employer. He had a warm relationship with his family, particularly his mother. At work he welcomed advice but made his own decisions.

After Rönngren's tenure it became clear that the Finland-Swedish stage language he had helped create had become so firmly established as a norm that the new generation found it artificial and called for a more natural, everyday manner of speech.

== In popular culture ==
In 2025 Rönngren was portrayed by Riko Eklundh in the play Amos A at Svenska Teatern, depicting his relationship with arts patron Amos Anderson (played by Patrick Henriksen) and Anderson's role as financier and benefactor of the theatre.

== Directing credits (incomplete) ==
Year	Production	Author(s)	Theatre
1929	The Threepenny Opera (Die Dreigroschenoper)	Bertolt Brecht and Kurt Weill	Svenska Teatern, Helsinki
1930	Daniel Hjort	Josef Julius Wecksell	Svenska Teatern, Helsinki
1933	De hundra dagarna (Campo di Maggio)	Giovacchino Forzano and Benito Mussolini, transl. Albert Nycop	Svenska Teatern, Helsinki
