= Politics of Åland =

Politics of Finnish region

Politics of the Åland Islands (Swedish: Ålands politik) operate within a parliamentary representative democracy. Åland is an autonomous, demilitarised, Swedish-speaking region of Finland.

Åland’s political system is based on the Act on the Autonomy of Åland and international agreements, which guarantee its autonomy and demilitarised status.

The Parliament of Åland (Lagting) is the central legislative body. Executive power lies with the Lantråd (premier), who leads the Government of Åland (Landskapsregering) and answers to the parliament.

== History ==
Åland’s political status has changed over time between Sweden, Russia, and Finland. In 1634, the islands became part of Åbo and Björneborg County during administrative reforms in Sweden. In 1809, Sweden ceded Finland, including Åland, to the Russian Empire. When Finland became independent in 1917, Åland became part of the new state.

During the Finnish Civil War in 1918, Russian troops remained on the islands, causing unrest. Sweden intervened and took control of Åland, and a petition signed by 7,135 residents called for union with Sweden. German forces also intervened. The dispute led to wider discussions, but no agreement was reached.

In 1921, the League of Nations ruled that Åland would remain part of Finland. It also guaranteed autonomy, protection of the Swedish language, and continued demilitarisation.

== Autonomy ==
Åland has its own flag, has issued postage stamps since 1984, maintains a local police force, and is represented in the Nordic Council. Male residents are exempt from conscription. Parliamentarism has been the custom since 1988.

Although Åland remains under Finnish sovereignty, it exercises extensive self-government and elects one representative to the Parliament of Finland. Since the 1920s, the central political issue has been the preservation and development of autonomy.

== Executive branch ==
The autonomous Government of Åland (Ålands landskapsregering) runs the executive branch on Åland.

The Finnish state is present through the State Department of Åland (Statens ämbetsverk på Åland). The Governor of Åland (currently Marine Holm-Johansson) leads the department, which handles national administrative tasks in the territory.

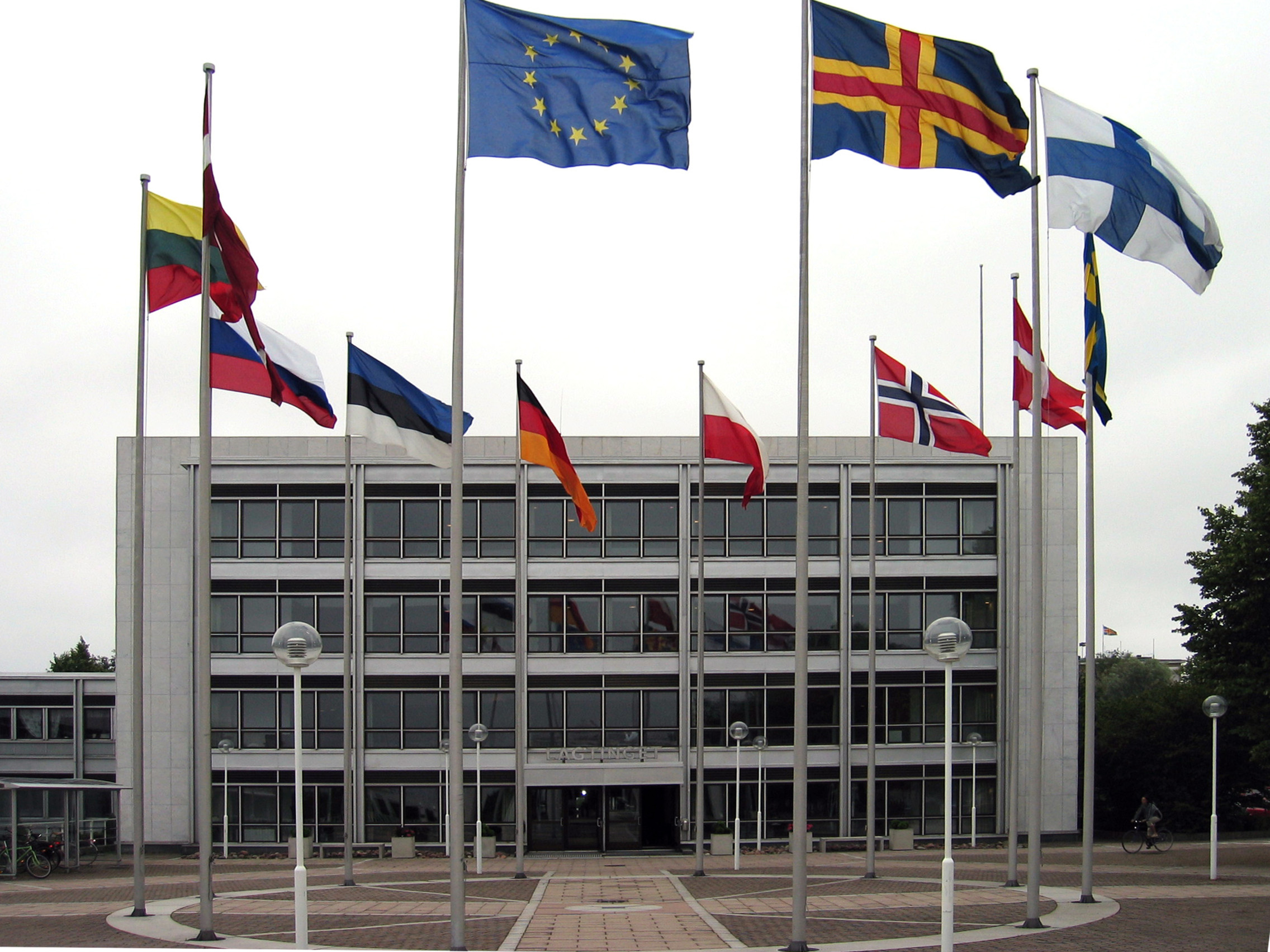
The Parliament of Åland building

== Legislative branch ==
The Parliament of Åland (Lagtinget, “law assembly”) is a single-chamber parliament of 30 members, elected every four years using proportional representation.

== Political parties and elections ==
Until the late 1970s, Ålandic politics centred more on individuals than on political parties. From the late 1970s onward, parties took on a more central role. The main parties since 1979 are:

- Åland Social Democrats
- Åland Centre
- Liberals for Åland
- Moderates of Åland

Compared with other Nordic regions, the political left is relatively weak.

== Local government ==
Åland is divided into 16 municipalities (kommuner). These local governments manage services such as education, healthcare, planning, and infrastructure.

== See also ==
- Politics of Finland
- Ting
- Swedish Assembly of Finland (Folktinget)
