= Tourism in Åland =

Tourism in Åland revolves around the Åland Islands and various attractions in the capital of Mariehamn. About 44% of tourists are from Finland. Tourism is promoted by Visit Åland, the official tourism organisation of the Åland Islands.

== Attractions ==
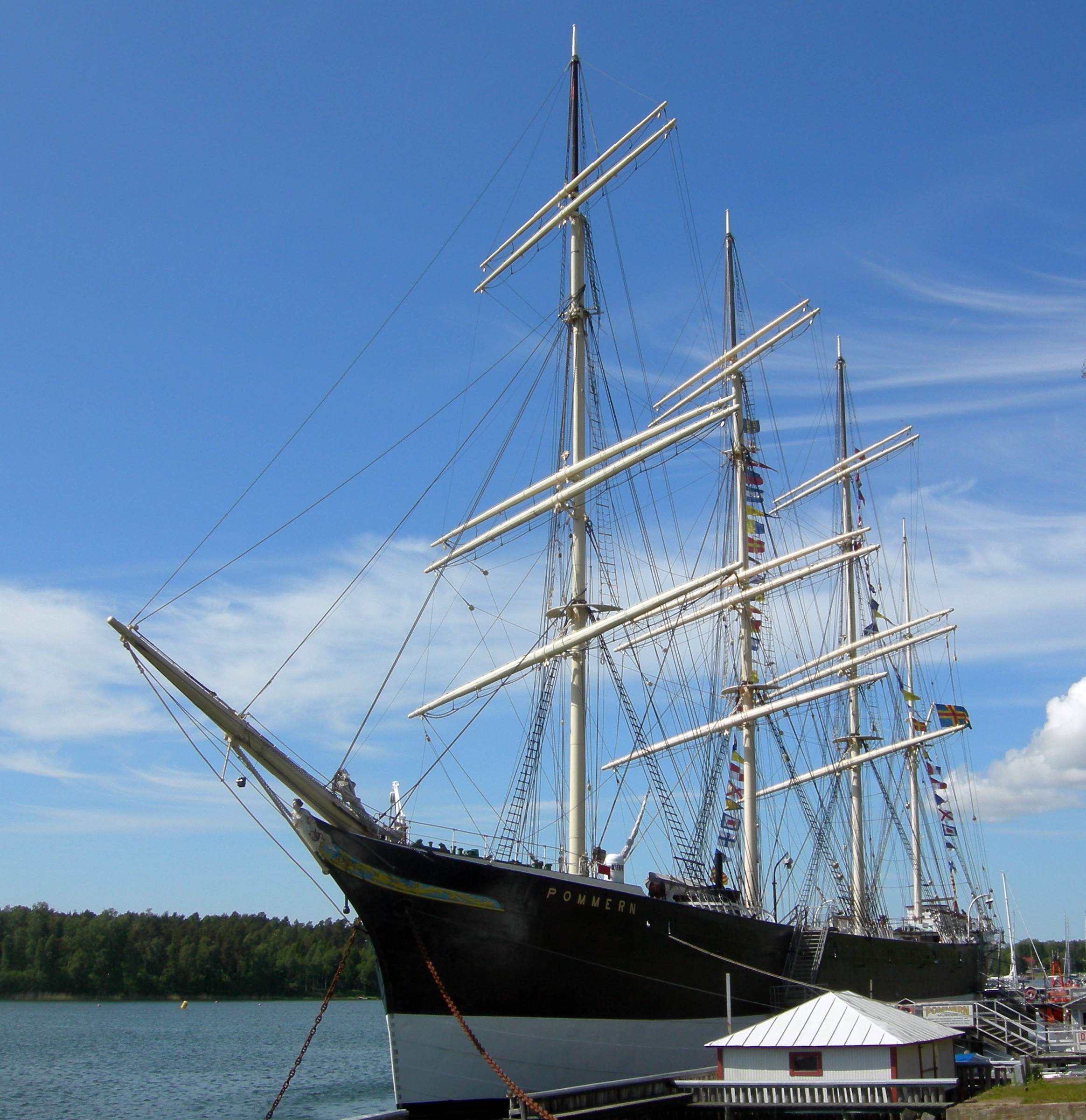
The museum ship Pommern in Mariehamn.

Åland's major tourist attraction is the mild nature of its seasons compared to other parts of Scandinavia. Åland experiences more sunshine hours per year than any other place in the region - in midsummer, the sun rises at approximately 3:30am and sets at about 10:00pm. In addition, Åland's summers are comparatively warm and its winters comparatively mild, making it a popular holiday destination among neighbouring Swedes and Finns.

Åland's capital, Mariehamn, has a long maritime history chronology. Primarily a shipping town, Mariehamn is home to a museum ship still in its original condition as a cargo carrier. The Åland Islands are a collection of islands in an archipelago, and the eight inhabited islands in the archipelago are home to a number of small villages, many with architectural monuments to the Åland Islands' past clearly evident in the form of ruined abbeys and castles. Kastelholm Castle, a medieval fortress whose construction began in the 1380s, today stands as a popular attraction for visitors.

Åland also draws a number of tourists looking to participate in outdoor activities, with diving, climbing, paddling, hiking, camping and horse riding popular with visitors. Hunting is also possible in Åland, and is actively encouraged by Visit Åland.

== Statistics ==
207,566 tourists arrived in Åland in 2009. This was a 9.9 percent decrease from the number of tourists arriving in 2008. 44.3 percent of the arriving tourists were from Finland, 43.9 percent of the arrivals were from Sweden and the remainder, 11.9 percent, were from other countries. The average stay for tourists in Åland was 2.1 nights, with the figure slightly lower for tourists from Finland (1.9 nights), the same for tourists from Sweden and higher for tourists from other countries (3.2 nights). 108,241 of the total number of tourists arriving in Åland in 2009 stayed in hotels, 26,072 stayed in guest houses, 39,620 stayed in cottages while the remainder, 39,620 visitors, camped as their form of accommodation. The number of guests from countries other than Finland and Sweden staying in hotels increased by 77.8 percent from 2008.

The number of overnight stays in Åland has seen a significant increase in recent years. In 2024, the total number of overnight stays in commercial accommodations reached almost 420,000, which was a 1.6% decrease over the previous year, but constitutes a 6% increase compared to 396,000 overnight stays in 2019. In 2024 there were 193,000 overnight tourists visiting Åland, meaning that the average overnight visitor stayed for 2.2 nights.

Visitors from Finland and Sweden have consistently made up the majority of tourists. Number of tourists from Finland first surpassed the number of tourists from Sweden in 2018, and the difference has been growing since. In 2024 Finnish overnight tourists made up 55% of the total, while the Swedish overnight tourists amounted to 35%.

Hotels remain the most popular accommodation choice, accounting for slightly more than half of overnight stays in 2022, at 231,000, out of 446,000 total.
