= Åland Islands dispute =

1917–1921 Sweden–Finland territorial dispute

Location of the Åland Islands

Åland Islands

The Åland Islands dispute (Swedish: Ålandsfrågan, lit. 'Åland question') was a territorial dispute between Sweden and Finland over the Åland Islands after World War I. Most Ålanders wanted to reunite with Sweden, but in 1921 the League of Nations decided that the islands would stay under Finnish rule, and that Finland was required to protect the islands’ Swedish language, culture, and autonomy.

== Background ==
Until 1809, Åland belonged to Sweden. After Sweden lost the Finnish War, the Treaty of Fredrikshamn transferred Finland and Åland to Imperial Russia. Åland became part of the Grand Duchy of Finland, which had some autonomy within the Russian Empire.

In 1856, the Treaty of Paris ended the Crimean War and banned Russia from building forts on Åland. Russia followed this agreement until 1908, when it tried to change the islands’ status, but faced resistance. During World War I, Russia built a submarine base on Åland for use by Russian and British forces.

== Conflict and foreign intervention (1917–1918) ==
After the October Revolution in 1917, Finland declared independence. At the same time, Åland’s Swedish-speaking population began pushing for self-rule and union with Sweden. Over 90% of Ålanders identified as Swedish, unlike most people in mainland Finland.

Some Swedish activists supported Åland’s aims, but the Swedish government stayed neutral. In January 1918, the Finnish Civil War began. Reports of unrest on Åland led Sweden to send a small naval force to evacuate civilians. The mission also helped reduce tensions between Russian troops and local militias.

Finland’s White government in Vaasa saw this as a possible threat. With Germany’s support, Finnish authorities urged Sweden to leave. German troops arrived in March 1918, and Swedish forces soon withdrew.

Later, Sweden, Finland, and Germany agreed to remove Russian forts from Åland. Meanwhile, some Ålanders in Helsinki formed the Åland Committee to promote regional autonomy within Finland.

== Diplomatic dispute and League of Nations ruling (1919–1921) ==
In 1919, both Sweden and Finland officially claimed Åland. Finland said the islands were historically and geographically linked to it. Sweden pointed to the islanders’ wish to join Sweden.

Sweden proposed a referendum, but Finland refused. Instead, Finland passed a law giving Åland cultural and political autonomy. However, leading Åland representatives, such as Julius Sundblom and Carl Björkman, rejected the law and were briefly jailed.

The dispute was brought to the new League of Nations. The League sent legal experts and three rapporteurs to Åland, Sweden, and France to gather information. Finland was represented by Carl Enckell, and Sweden by Erik Palmstierna.

In June 1921, the League decided Åland would stay with Finland, but Finland had to protect the islanders’ language, culture, and traditions. The decision reflected Finland’s diplomatic efforts and support from Japan, which said the islands were part of the Finnish archipelago.

== Later developments ==
Sweden and Finland improved relations in the 1920s and 1930s. In 1930, they discussed a joint defense plan for Åland, called the Stockholm Plan, but dropped it due to opposition from the Soviet Union.

During World War II, Sweden remained neutral and did not intervene in Åland. Over time, many Ålanders began to see Finnish rule as fair and supportive, changing their perception of the political situation from being "a Swedish province under Finnish possession" to "an autonomous part of Finland".

== Autonomy and legacy ==
In 1920, Finland passed the Act on the Autonomy of Åland, which gave the islands their own parliament and strong cultural and political rights. The League of Nations considered these guarantees enough to protect Åland’s identity.

By the late 20th century, many Ålanders saw themselves not as Swedish, but as an autonomous, culturally unique region within Finland.

== See also ==
- Autonomy of Åland
- Åland's Autonomy Day
- Finland–Sweden relations
- Swedish neutrality
- International crisis
