= Åland Post =

Company

- Founded: 1993
- Headquarters: Mariehamn
- Website: www.alandpost.com (international) alandpost.ax (local, Åland) www.alandstamps.com (Stamps)

Åland Post is the company responsible for postal service in Åland. Åland Post has operated separately from the mainland postal service of Finland since 1993.

Åland Post is a logistics enterprise with 150 employees. Turnover in 2024 was 34.8 million euro. Since 1 January 2009, Åland Post has been a limited company owned solely by the Åland Landskapsregering, the Government of Åland.

Åland Post is organised in four business areas: Logistics, Postal Services, Print & Distribution and Axla Logistics, Åland Post's brand for e-commerce logistics service run out of Tuusula, Finland.

== Åland stamps ==
When the first Åland stamps were issued on 1 March 1984, it was the result of a longterm process that started already in the 1950s when Åland got its own flag in 1954. Attempts intensified in the 1970s when the Faroe Islands got their own stamps, but all applications to the postal authorities in Helsinki were rejected. The turning point came in 1979 when the Ålanders turned to the Ministry of Justice, justifying the request for their own stamps by saying they would be an important symbol of the autonomy. Finnish Minister of Justice at the time, Christoffer Taxell, took the issue further and, in 1982, President Mauno Koivisto approved the Åland Stamp Ordinance. The stamps were issued by the Posts and Telecommunications of Finland and were only valid for mail posted in Åland.

From 1984 to 1992, the Posts and Telecommunications of Finland was responsible for the stamp production, while the motifs were produced in collaboration with the Åland provincial government and its stamp delegation. Great emphasis was placed on the connection of the motifs to Åland autonomy and history.

On 1 January 1993, a new Autonomy Act came into force, giving Åland the right to establish its own postal administration. The Åland Post then took over the production and sale of Åland stamps.
