= 1919 Ålandic status referendum =

Unofficial referendum on Åland joining Sweden

- June 1919
- Integration into Sweden?
- Outcome: Not recognised by the League of Nations; Åland remained under Finnish sovereignty

Results
| Choice | Votes | % |
|---|---|---|
| Yes | 9,735 | 95.48% |
| No | 461 | 4.52% |

An unofficial referendum on integration into Sweden was held in Åland in June 1919. The vote took the form of a petition, in which participants signed in either a yes or a no column. It was organised by the Lagting and approved by a vote on 1 June.

The proposal was supported by a large majority of participants but had no legal effect. In 1921, the League of Nations ruled that Finland would retain sovereignty over Åland, and the islands remained under Finnish control.

== Results ==
| Choice | Votes | % |
|---|---|---|
| For | 9,735 | 95.48 |
| Against | 461 | 4.52 |
| Total | 10,196 | 100.00 |
| Registered voters/turnout | | 96.40 |
Source: Direct Democracy
