= Act on the Autonomy of Åland =

Finnish law enacted in 1920

Act on Åland Autonomy
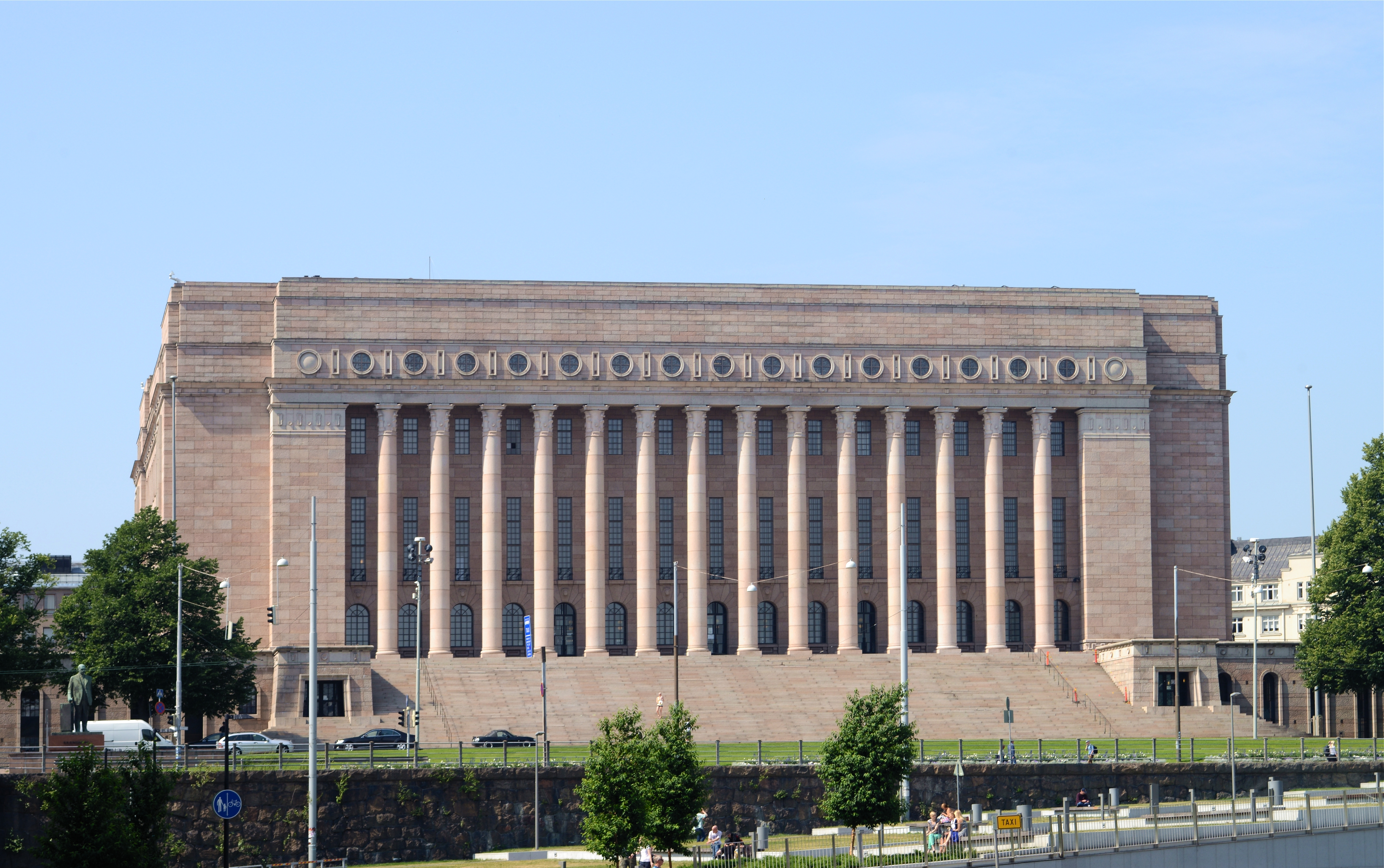

Parliament of Finland
- Long title: Act on the Autonomy of Åland
- Territorial extent: Åland, Finland
- Enacted by: Parliament of Finland
- Enacted: 6 May 1920

Related legislation
- Act on the Autonomy of Åland (1951), Act on the Autonomy of Åland (1991)
- Status: In force

The Act on Åland Autonomy (Självstyrelselagen) is the fundamental law defining the political status of the Åland Islands within Finland. It was adopted by the Parliament of Finland on 6 May 1920 in response to the Åland Question (also known as the Åland Islands dispute). The Act provides for Finnish sovereignty over Åland while guaranteeing the preservation of the Swedish language and local culture, as well as political self-government.

The Act was initially opposed by many Ålanders, who sought incorporation into Sweden. The dispute was later referred to the League of Nations, which, in 1921, ruled that Finland would retain sovereignty over Åland while the islands would be granted extensive autonomy and cultural protections.

== Background ==
The Åland Islands, an archipelago in the Baltic Sea between Sweden and Finland, were part of the Kingdom of Sweden until 1809, when Sweden ceded Finland and Åland to Russia under the Treaty of Fredrikshamn following Sweden’s defeat in the Finnish War. As part of the Grand Duchy of Finland, Åland remained linguistically and culturally Swedish.

=== Petition to Sweden ===
In 1917, during the collapse of the Russian Empire, representatives of all Åland municipalities met at the Åland Folk High School and resolved to seek unification with Sweden. In December 1917, a petition with 7,135 signatures—representing a large majority of the adult population—was submitted to King Gustav V of Sweden.

=== Military presence ===
When Finland declared independence on 6 December 1917, Ålanders invoked the principle of national self-determination, but Finland’s parliament rejected reunification and instead proposed autonomy through legislation. Ålanders initially refused. Tensions led Sweden to send a peacekeeping force in February 1918. Russian, Finnish, and later German troops were also present before withdrawing in 1919.

=== Referendum of 1919 ===
In June 1919, an unofficial 1919 Ålandic status referendum recorded more than 95% support for union with Sweden, but Finland refused to recognise the result.

== Content of the Act ==
The Act defines Åland's autonomy within Finland. Its main provisions are:

- Representation: The Finnish government is represented by a provincial governor.
- Home region right (hembygdsrätt):
  - Gives residents the right to vote, own property, run businesses, and be exempt from conscription
  - Requires five years of residence, knowledge of Swedish, and Finnish citizenship
- Legislative powers: A provincial parliament and government may pass laws in specific areas.
  - Provincial laws are reviewed by the Ministry of Justice
  - The President of Finland may annul laws that exceed provincial powers or affect national security
- Judicial structure: A provincial administrative court hears cases first. Appeals go to the Supreme Administrative Court of Finland.
- Language provisions: Swedish is the only official language. Åland residents are not required to study Finnish, and Finnish citizens may use Finnish in personal matters.
- Finances: The Act sets rules for provincial finances and relations with the central government.
- International treaties: Åland may opt out of certain international treaties, such as exclusion from the European Union VAT area.

== Revisions ==
The original 1920 Act was replaced in 1951 and again in 1991, the latter being the current law. A further reform is under preparation in the 2020s.

== Autonomy Day ==
Åland celebrates Åland's Autonomy Day on 9 June, marking the first meeting of its county council in 1922. It is a public holiday and official flag day.
