= Åland's Autonomy Day =

Finnish regional holiday

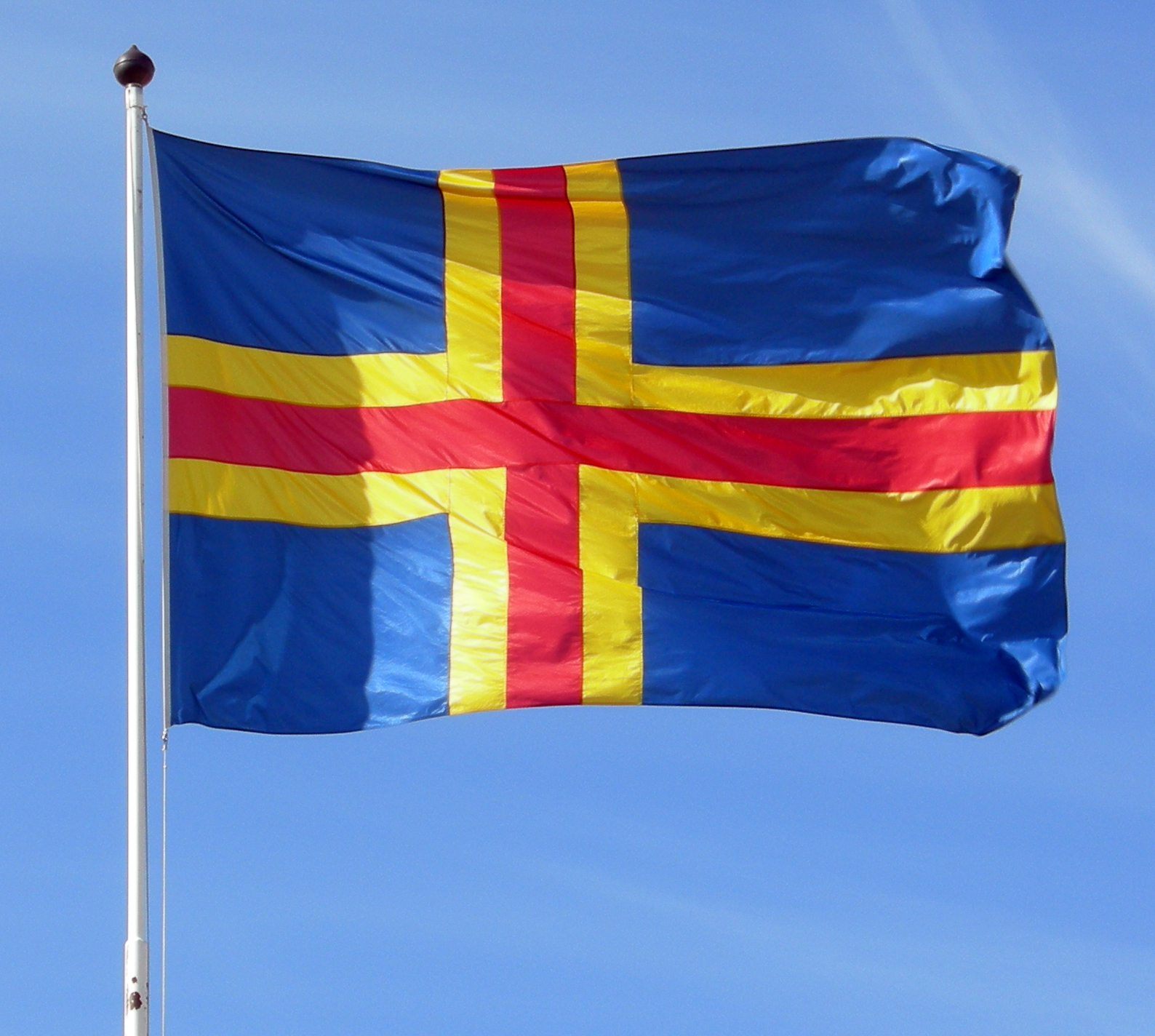
- Flag of Åland
- Official name: Ålands självstyrelsedag (Swedish)
- Also called: Åland's Self-Government Day
- Observed by: Åland
- Significance: Day the Parliament of Åland first met at Åland's Regional Assembly
- Date: 9 June
- Next time: 9 June 2026
- Frequency: Annual
- Related to: Åland Islands dispute

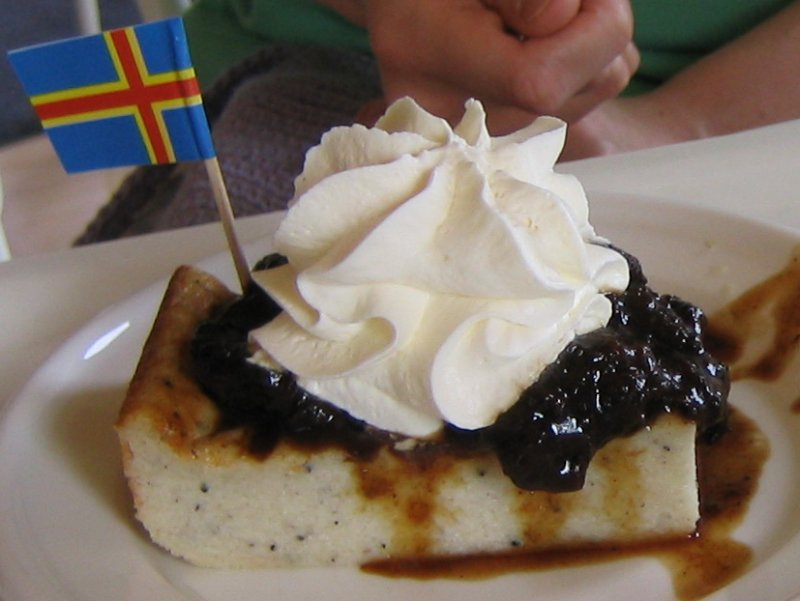
On Autonomy Day, it is tradition to enjoy an Åland pancake.

Åland's Autonomy Day, or Åland's Self-Government Day (Swedish: Ålands självstyrelsedag), is celebrated annually on 9 June to commemorate the first meeting of the Åland County Council (renamed the Parliament of Åland in 1993) on that date in 1922. Åland's self-government from Finland was established in 1921 by a decision of the League of Nations, following the Åland Movement's demand for reunification with Sweden.

Provisions on Åland's Autonomy Day are set out in Provincial Act (1976:26) on Åland's Autonomy Day. According to the Provincial Act (1992:41) on the Åland flag, the day is an official flag-flying day in the autonomous region. It is a paid holiday for employees in the regional and municipal public sectors.

The 100th anniversary of Åland’s autonomy was observed on 9 June 2021, followed by a year of celebrations.

== See also ==
- Public holidays in Finland
- Self-governance
