= Åland =

Autonomous region of Finland

Åland Region of Åland Landskapet Åland (Swedish) Ahvenanmaan maakunta (Finnish)
- Autonomous region
- Flag Coat of arms
- Anthem: Ålänningens sång (Swedish) (English: "The Ålander's Song")
- Location of Åland within Finland
- Country: Finland
- Autonomy granted: 7 May 1920
- First Regional Assembly: 9 June 1922 (Autonomy Day)
- EU accession: 1 January 1995
- Capital and largest city: Mariehamn; 60°07′N 019°54′E
- Official languages: Swedish
- Demonym(s): Ålandic/Ålandish; Ålander; Ålänning; Åländare
- Government: Devolved parliamentary autonomous region
  - Governor: Marine Holm-Johansson
  - Lantråd: Katrin Sjögren
  - Vice lantråd: Annika Hambrudd
- Legislature: Parliament of Åland

National representation
  - Parliament of Finland: Mats Löfström

Area
  - Total: 1,580.12 km^{2} (610.09 sq mi)
- Elevation: 129.1 m (424 ft)

Population
  - 2024 estimate: 30,654 (223rd)
  - Density: 19.07/km^{2} (49.4/sq mi)
- GDP (PPP): 2022 estimate
  - Total: $1.6 billion
  - Per capita: $42,408
- GDP (nominal): 2022 estimate
  - Total: €1.4 billion
  - Per capita: €37,200
- HDI (2022): 0.937 very high
- Currency: Euro (€) (EUR)
- Time zone: UTC+02:00 (Eastern European Time)
  - Summer (DST): UTC+03:00 (Eastern European Summer Time)
- Date format: dd.mm.yyyy
- Driving side: Right
- Calling code: +358 18
- ISO 3166 code: AX; FI-01
- Internet TLD: .ax
- Website: www.aland.ax

Åland (/ˈɔːlənd/ AW-lənd, Swedish: [ˈǒːland]; Finnish: Ahvenanmaa) is an autonomous and demilitarised region of Finland. Receiving its autonomy in 1920, it is the smallest region of Finland by both area (1,580 km^{2} or 610 sq mi) and population (30,654), constituting 0.51% of Finland's land area and 0.54% of its population. Its official language is Swedish and the capital city is Mariehamn.

Åland is situated in an archipelago, called the Åland Islands, at the entrance to the Gulf of Bothnia in the Baltic Sea. It comprises Fasta Åland, on which 90% of the population resides, and about 6,500 skerries and islands to its east, of which about 60–80 are inhabited. Fasta Åland is separated from the coast of Roslagen in Sweden by 38 km (20 1/2 nautical miles) of open water to the west. In the east, the Åland archipelago is contiguous with the Finnish archipelago. Åland's only land border is located on the uninhabited skerry of Märket, which it shares with Sweden. From Mariehamn, there is a ferry distance of about 160 km (86 nautical miles) to Turku, a coastal city of mainland Finland, and also to Stockholm, the capital of Sweden.

Åland's autonomous status means that those provincial powers normally exercised by representatives of the central Finnish Government are largely exercised by its own government. The current demilitarised, neutral position of Åland dates back to the Paris Peace Treaty after the Åland War in the 1850s.

== Autonomy ==
The dispute over Åland's status led the League of Nations to confirm Åland's autonomy in 1921. Åland's autonomous status was also recognised in Finland's treaty of accession to the European Union. Åland is demilitarised and politically neutral. Because of its demilitarised status, residents are exempt from universal male conscription into the Finnish Defence Forces.

The Parliament of Finland granted Åland extensive autonomy under the Act on the Autonomy of Åland of 1920. New autonomy acts were adopted in 1951 and 1991. The constitution of Finland provides that Åland's autonomy is governed by the Act. The Act also establishes Swedish as Åland's sole official language.

Because Åland formed a distinct customs territory, it held a separate referendum on joining the European Union on 20 November 1994, after the referendum in mainland Finland on 16 October. EU membership was approved by 73.64% of voters.

A specific protocol on Åland forms part of Finland's EU accession treaty. It allows Åland to retain restrictions on people without Ålandic home region rights (hembygdsrätt), including restrictions on acquiring and holding real property and on providing certain services in Åland.

== Etymology ==
The Proto-Norse form of the name Åland is reconstructed as Ahvaland. The Proto-Germanic word ahwō, meaning "water", is related to Latin aqua. In Swedish, the name developed from Áland to Åland. The name is traditionally interpreted as "river land".

The Finnish and Estonian names, Ahvenanmaa and Ahvenamaa, literally mean "perch land"; Finnish ahven means "perch". The relationship between these names and Swedish Åland is uncertain. Several explanations have been proposed: the Finnish name may derive from Swedish, preserve an older form that later developed into the Swedish name, or have developed independently.

The official Swedish name, Landskapet Åland, means "the Region of Åland".

== History ==
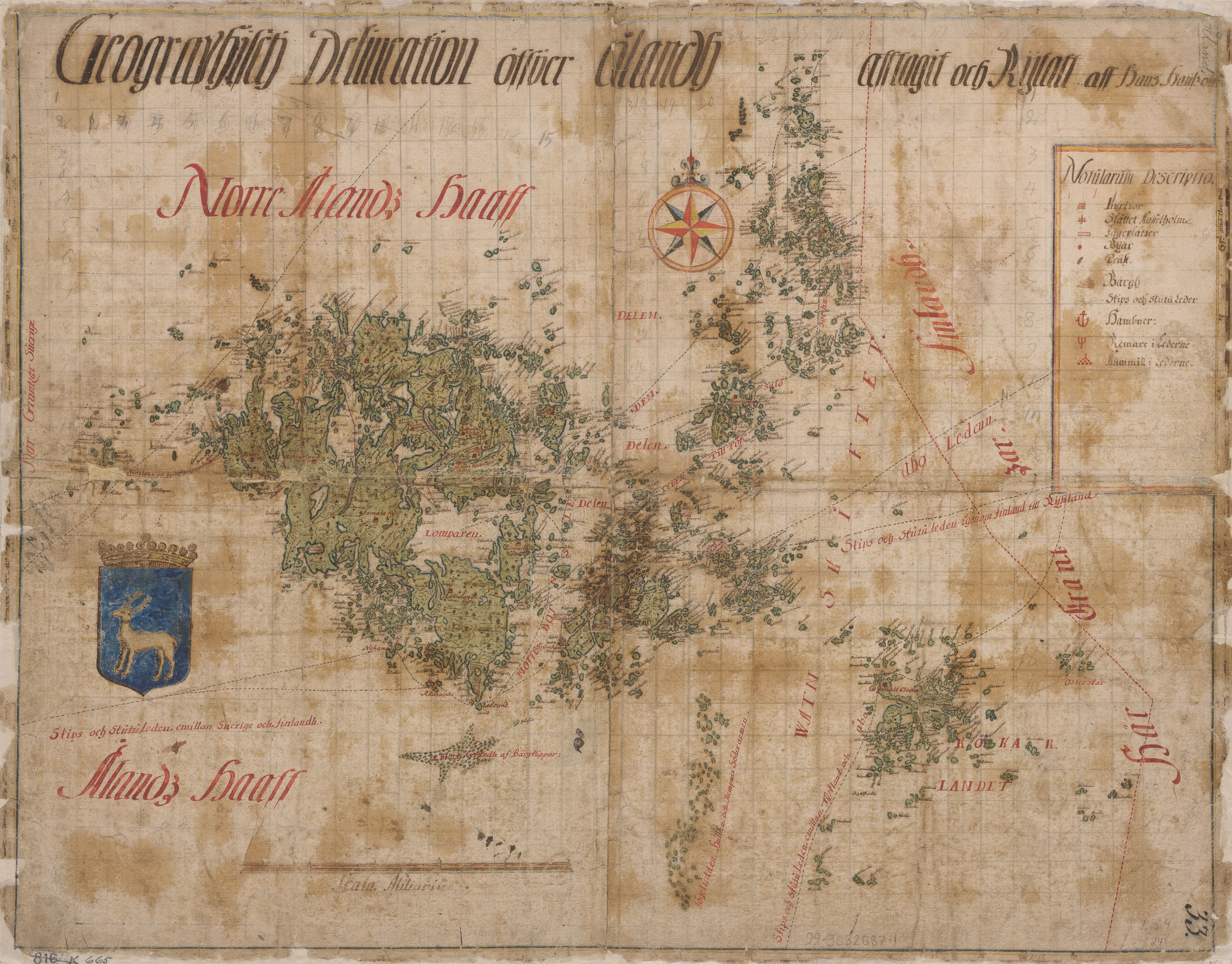
Swedish map of Åland from before 1667, showing shipping lanes, harbours, churches, and boundaries.

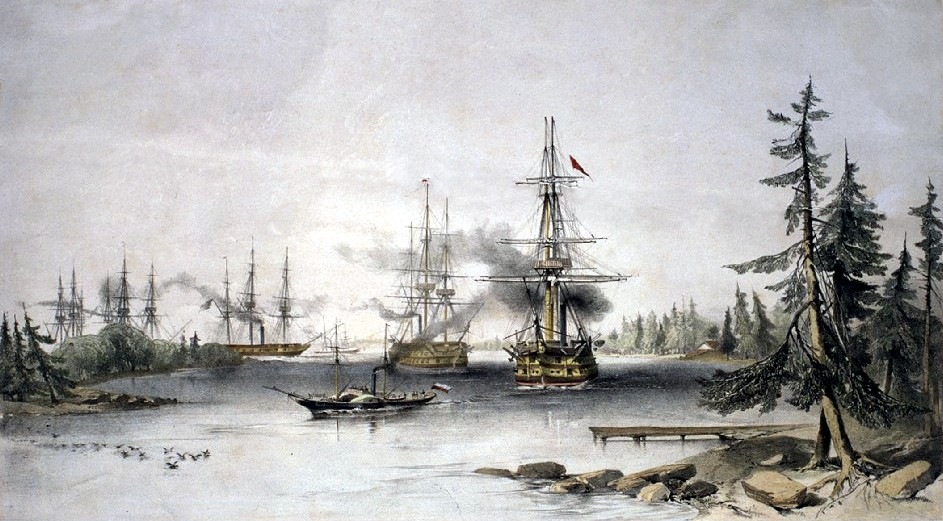
The Åland Islands during the Crimean War. Site of the Battle of Bomarsund.

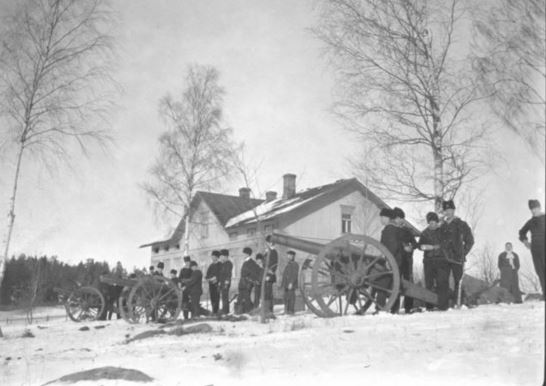
Swedish artillerymen in Haraldsby during the Invasion of Åland in 1918.

People from the Comb Ceramic culture began settling the Åland Islands around 7000 years ago, after the land started rising from the sea following the last Ice Age. Åland became a meeting point for two Neolithic cultures: the Comb Ceramic culture and the later Pit–Comb Ware culture, which spread from the west.

During the Stone Age and Bronze Age, people lived by hunting seals and birds, fishing, and gathering plants. Farming also began early. From the Iron Age, six hillforts remain on Åland. More than 380 burial sites from the Viking Age have been documented.

Construction of Kastelholm Castle began in the 1380s. In 1505, Danish naval officer Søren Norby captured it during a raid. The Kastelholm witch trials were held there in 1665 and 1668.

The coat of arms of Åland was originally meant for the Swedish island of Öland in 1560 but was assigned to Åland by mistake. It shows a golden red deer (not native to Åland) on a blue field. Traditionally, it is topped with a comital coronet from the older Swedish heraldic style.

In 1809, Sweden ceded Åland and Finland to the Russian Empire under the Treaty of Fredrikshamn. The islands became part of the Grand Duchy of Finland, which existed until 1917.

In 1832, Russia began building the fortress of Bomarsund on Åland. During the Crimean War in 1854, British and French forces captured and destroyed it. The Treaty of Paris (1856) then demilitarised the archipelago. Russia later remilitarised Åland during World War I to guard against a German invasion.

In 1918, during the Finnish Civil War, Swedish troops landed on Åland as a peacekeeping force between Russian soldiers and Finnish White and Red forces. Soon after, German troops occupied the islands at the request of the Finnish White Senate. The only major battle was the Battle of Godby near the village of Godby in Finström.

After 1917, Ålanders campaigned to join Sweden. In 1919, a petition signed by 96.4% of voters supported leaving Finland and uniting with Sweden. This was partly due to anti-Swedish policies in Finland and growing Finnish nationalism, driven by the country’s struggle against attempts of Russification. The long-standing conflict between Finland's Swedish- and Finnish-speaking communities added to Ålanders' concerns.

Finland rejected the petition but offered Åland autonomy. Ålanders refused, and the case went to the League of Nations in 1921. The League ruled that Finland would keep sovereignty but must give Åland political autonomy. A key diplomat behind the decision was Nitobe Inazō, an Under-Secretary General of the League and director of the International Committee on Intellectual Cooperation.

The Åland convention of 20 October 1921, signed by Sweden, Finland, and several European countries, was the League's first major international agreement. It guaranteed Ålanders' rights to their language, culture, and traditions, and declared Åland a neutral and demilitarised zone.

Åland's Regional Assembly held its first session in Mariehamn on 9 June 1922. That day is now celebrated as Self-Government Day of Åland.

In 2006, Finland marked 150 years of Åland's demilitarisation by issuing a €5 commemorative coin. The obverse shows a pine tree, common in Åland, while the reverse depicts a boat's stern and rudder with a dove on the tiller—symbolising 150 years of peace.

== Politics ==
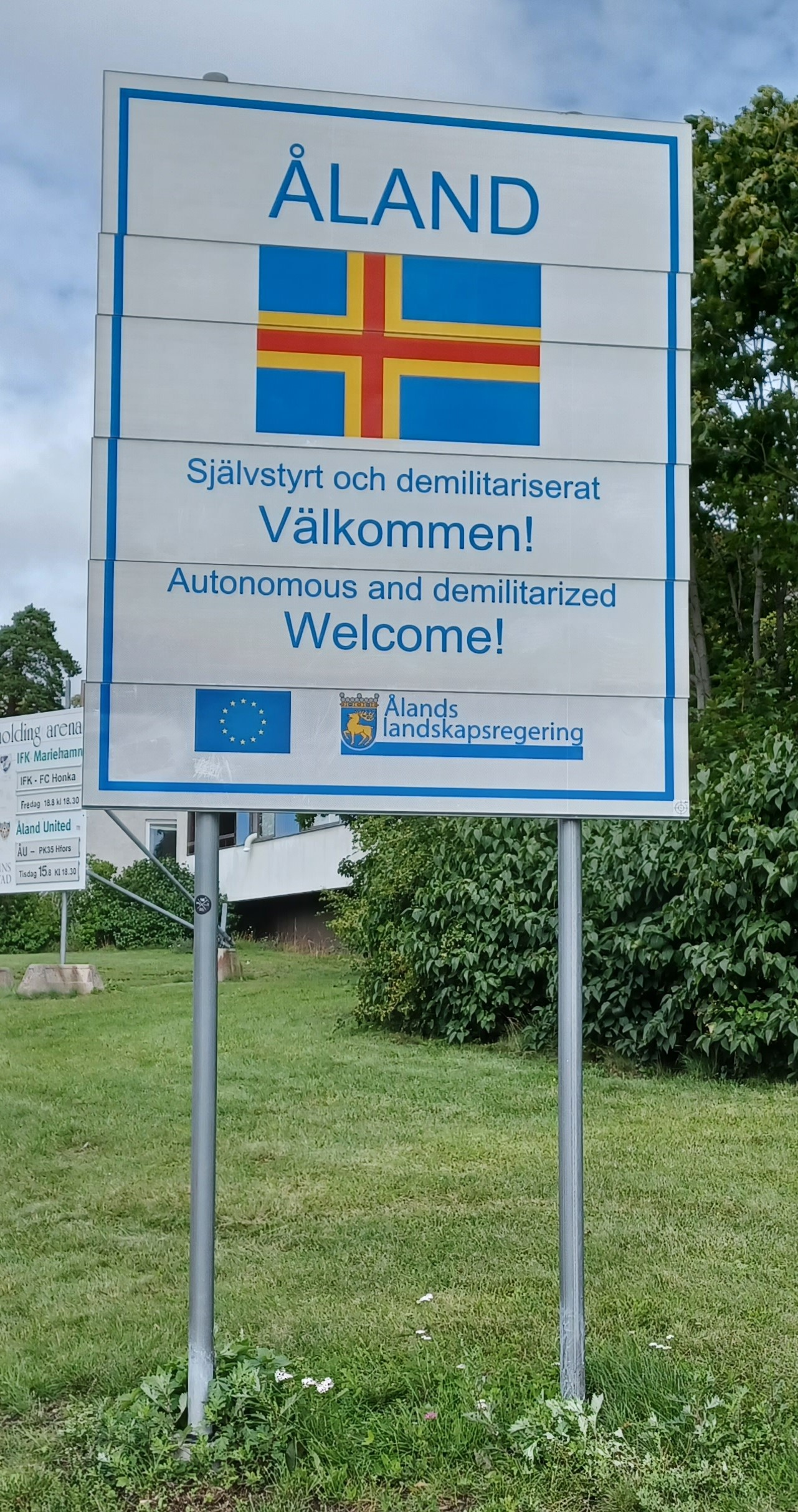
Public signage showing Åland's autonomous status.

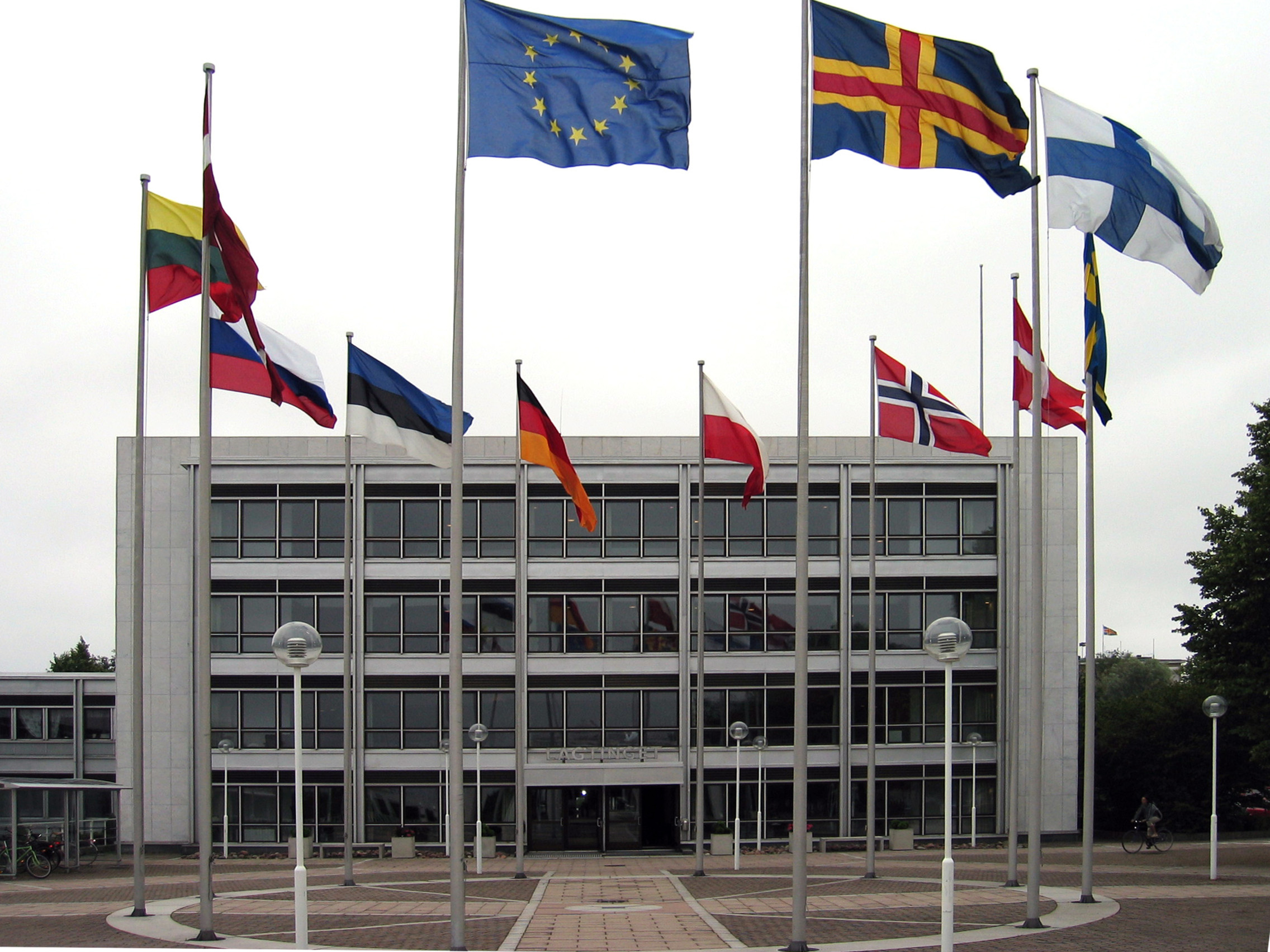
The Parliament of Åland with flags of the European Union, Åland, Finland, and other nearby countries.

=== Self-government ===
Åland's political system is based on the Act on the Autonomy of Åland and related international agreements. These guarantee Åland wide-ranging self-rule, while Finland retains ultimate sovereignty. The Government of Åland (Landskapsregering) is responsible to the Parliament of Åland (Lagting) under a parliamentary system. As Åland's autonomy predates Finland's current regional system, it also performs many functions handled by regional councils in mainland Finland.

=== Elections and parties ===
Åland holds one seat in the Parliament of Finland. Its political system operates separately from mainland Finland's and includes distinct parties such as the Future of Åland (Ålands Framtid), which advocates full independence.

=== Public services and symbols ===
Åland maintains its own flag and operates its postal service through Åland Post since 1984. Åland Post is part of the Small European Postal Administration Cooperation network.

The region also has its own police force and is an associate member of the Nordic Council. Åland also uses distinct call sign prefixes for amateur radio (e.g., OH0).

=== Civil rights ===
Homeschooling is permitted in Åland, attracting families from Sweden, where stricter regulations apply.

Authorities planned to introduce internet voting for overseas voters in the 2019 parliamentary election, with broader use considered for 2023. The project was later abandoned due to security concerns.

== European Union ==
Åland held a separate referendum on European Union membership on 20 November 1994. With majority support, it joined the EU alongside Finland in 1995. The Åland Protocol defines a special relationship, granting exceptions for land ownership, local business laws, and tax regulations. Åland is treated as a third-country territory for taxation, allowing duty-free sales on ferries between Åland, Finland, and Sweden.

== Administration ==
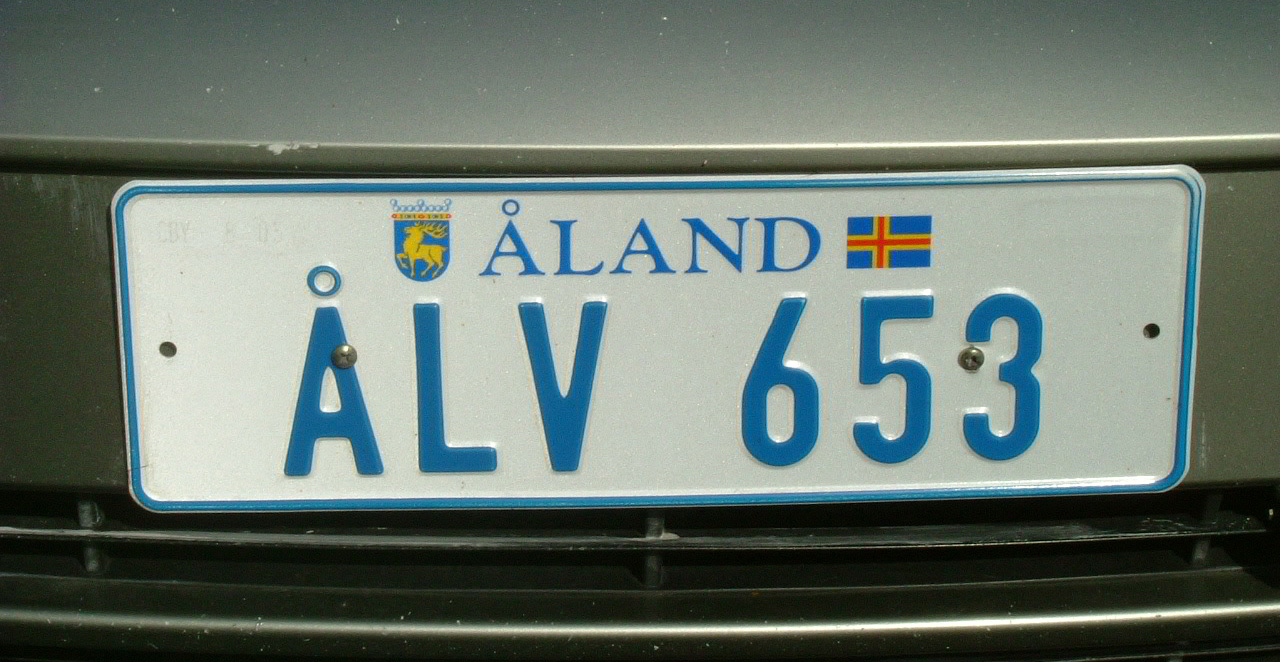
An Åland licence plate.

=== Governor and state office ===
The State Department of Åland represents Finland's national government in the region and manages tasks that in mainland Finland are handled by regional agencies. Before 2010, these duties belonged to the Åland State Provincial Office.

The Governor is appointed by the President of Finland after consulting the Lagting Speaker. If no agreement is reached, the Lagting proposes five candidates for the President to choose from.

=== Municipalities ===
Åland comprises 16 municipalities, with over 40% of residents concentrated in the capital Mariehamn.

- Mariehamn, population: 11 866 ▲ (2024)
- Jomala, population: 5 789 ▲ (2024)
- Finström, population: 2 617 ▲ (2024)
- Lemland, population: 2 134 ▲ (2024)
- Saltvik, population: 1 778 ▼ (2024)
- Hammarland, population: 1 636 ▼ (2024)
- Sund, population: 1 001 ▲ (2024)
- Eckerö, population: 956 ▲ (2024)
- Föglö, population: 502 ▼ (2024)
- Geta, population: 514 ▲ (2024)
- Vårdö, population: 459 ▼ (2024)
- Brändö, population: 430 ▼ (2024)
- Lumparland, population: 371 ▲ (2024)
- Kumlinge, population: 273 ▼ (2024)
- Kökar, population: 227 ▲ (2024)
- Sottunga, population: 101 ▼ (2024)

2024 population statistics. Arrows denote demographic trends since the 2023 census.

== Geography ==
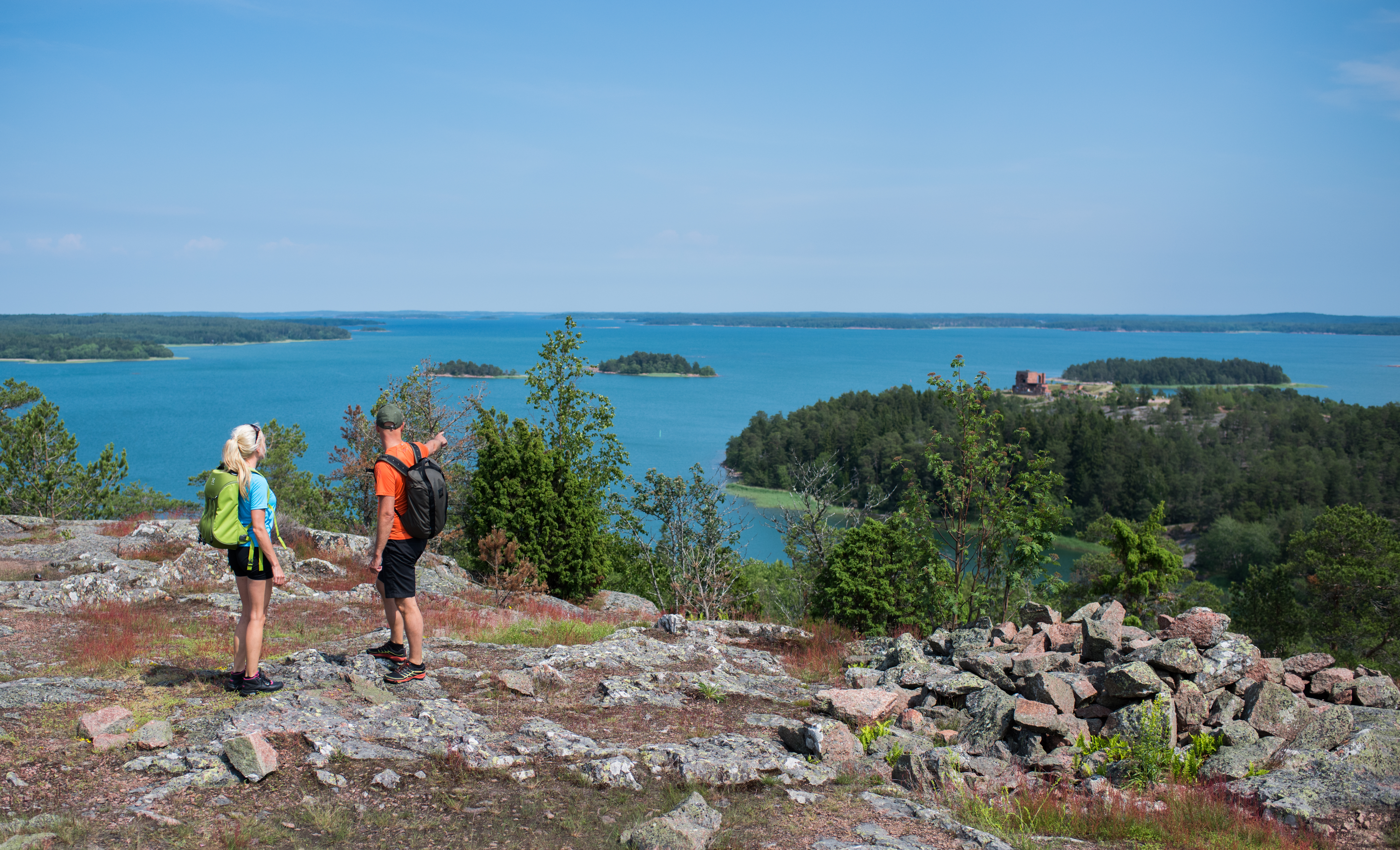
Hiking in Åland.

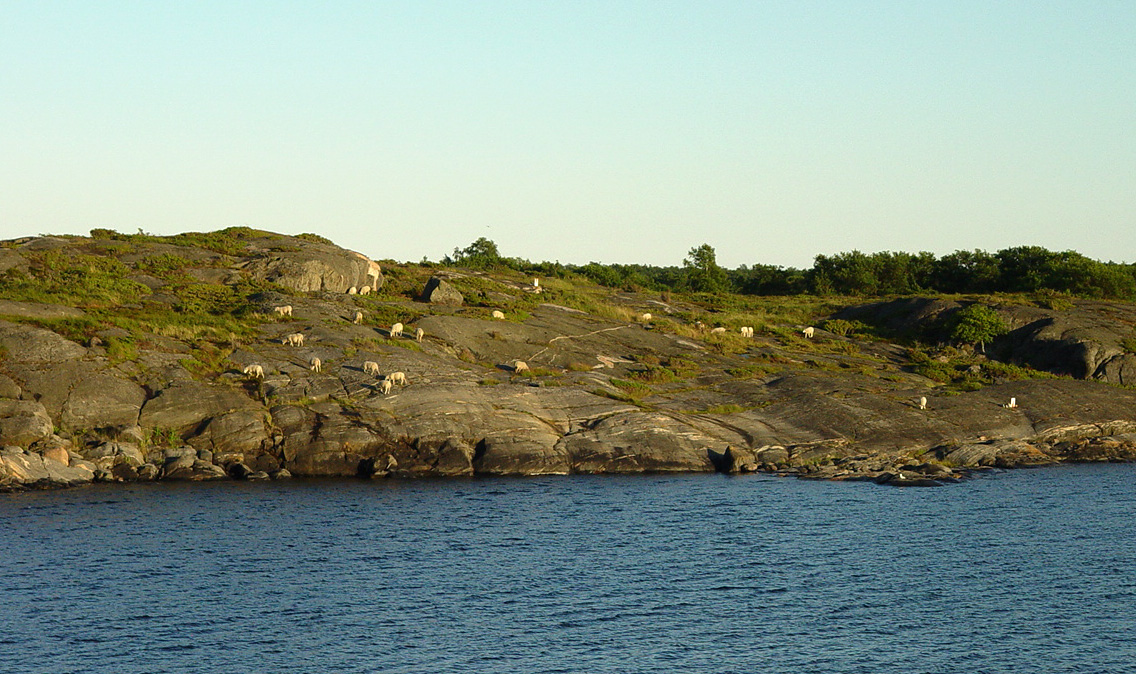
Sheep grazing on a small island.

Topographic map showing Åland's geography and municipalities.

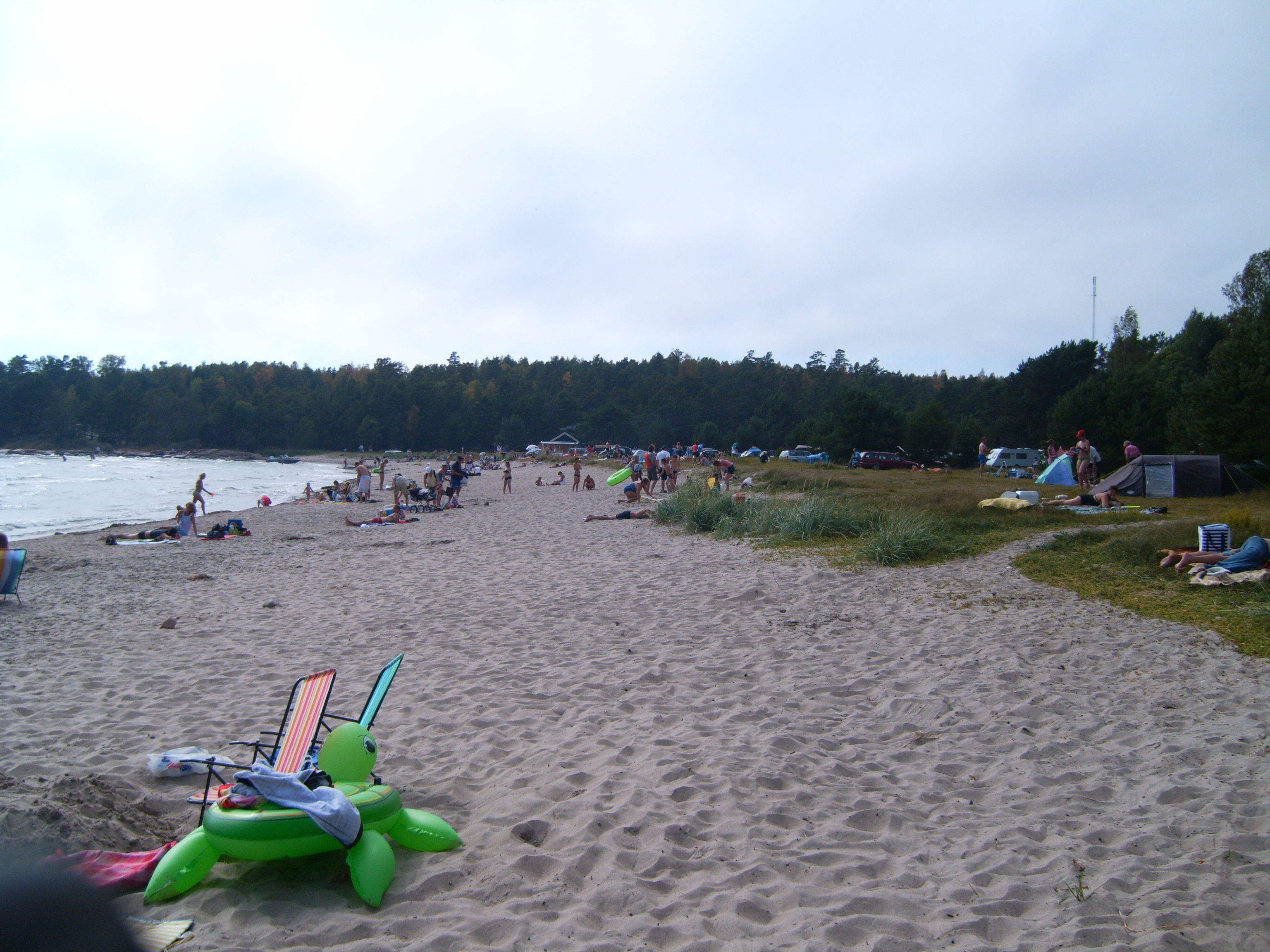
Degersand Beach in Eckerö.

Åland occupies a strategic position at the entrance to the port of Stockholm, near the Gulf of Bothnia and close to the Gulf of Finland.

The Åland archipelago consists of nearly 300 habitable islands, of which about 60 to 80 are inhabited. The rest—more than 6,000—are small skerries and bare rocks. The archipelago continues eastward into the Åboland region, part of the Archipelago Sea off Finland's southwest coast. West of Åland lies the Sea of Åland; to the north is the Bothnian Sea.

The terrain is mostly rocky, with thin soil shaped by glacial activity at the end of the last ice age. Meadows and pastures host many insects, including the Glanville fritillary butterfly.

The total land area of Åland is 1,527 km^{2} (590 sq mi). About 90% of the population lives on Fasta Åland, the largest island and location of the capital Mariehamn. Its area is estimated at between 740 km^{2} (290 sq mi) and 879 km^{2} (339 sq mi), depending on definition. Some sources list over 1,010 km^{2} (390 sq mi). The island contains several harbours.

During the Åland Islands dispute, Swedish and Finnish maps portrayed the region differently. The Swedish maps focused on the main island and downplayed surrounding skerries, making Åland appear closer to Sweden. Finnish maps emphasized continuity with the Finnish archipelago by showing more small islands and inflating their size. This influenced the popular figure of "over 6,000" skerries, widely repeated since the arbitration.

Some wildlife, such as elk and other deer species, were introduced in the 20th century and are not native to the islands.

=== Climate ===
Åland has a humid continental climate (Dfb), strongly influenced by its maritime setting. Summers are cooler than on the mainland of Sweden and Finland, while winters are slightly milder than in adjacent parts of Finland.

Climate data for Mariehamn Airport (normals 1991–2020, extremes 1914–present)
Month	Jan	Feb	Mar	Apr	May	Jun	Jul	Aug	Sep	Oct	Nov	Dec	Year
Record high °C (°F)	10.9 (51.6)	10.5 (50.9)	17.0 (62.6)	21.1 (70.0)	27.1 (80.8)	29.4 (84.9)	31.3 (88.3)	30.7 (87.3)	24.8 (76.6)	19.0 (66.2)	16.6 (61.9)	11.1 (52.0)	31.3 (88.3)
Mean daily maximum °C (°F)	1.0 (33.8)	0.4 (32.7)	3.1 (37.6)	8.0 (46.4)	13.4 (56.1)	17.5 (63.5)	20.8 (69.4)	20.0 (68.0)	15.5 (59.9)	9.6 (49.3)	5.2 (41.4)	2.5 (36.5)	9.8 (49.6)
Daily mean °C (°F)	−1.3 (29.7)	−2.3 (27.9)	−0.2 (31.6)	3.8 (38.8)	8.9 (48.0)	13.3 (55.9)	16.8 (62.2)	16.1 (61.0)	11.8 (53.2)	6.8 (44.2)	3.2 (37.8)	0.4 (32.7)	6.4 (43.5)
Mean daily minimum °C (°F)	−4.3 (24.3)	−5.5 (22.1)	−3.7 (25.3)	−0.1 (31.8)	4.0 (39.2)	8.6 (47.5)	12.2 (54.0)	11.6 (52.9)	7.8 (46.0)	3.5 (38.3)	0.6 (33.1)	−2.5 (27.5)	2.7 (36.9)
Record low °C (°F)	−32.3 (−26.1)	−32.9 (−27.2)	−25.0 (−13.0)	−18.9 (−2.0)	−6.5 (20.3)	−3.2 (26.2)	0.1 (32.2)	−0.5 (31.1)	−6.7 (19.9)	−11.8 (10.8)	−20.0 (−4.0)	−28.9 (−20.0)	−32.9 (−27.2)
Average precipitation mm (inches)	53 (2.1)	35 (1.4)	38 (1.5)	31 (1.2)	35 (1.4)	53 (2.1)	52 (2.0)	76 (3.0)	61 (2.4)	70 (2.8)	71 (2.8)	59 (2.3)	634 (25)
Average precipitation days	17	13	12	9	10	10	9	13	12	16	17	17	155
Mean monthly sunshine hours	39	74	130	207	297	296	312	235	163	91	41	26	1,911
Source 1: FMI climatological normals for Finland 1991–2020
Source 2: record highs and lows 1961– present FMI(record highs and lows 1914–1961)

== Economy ==
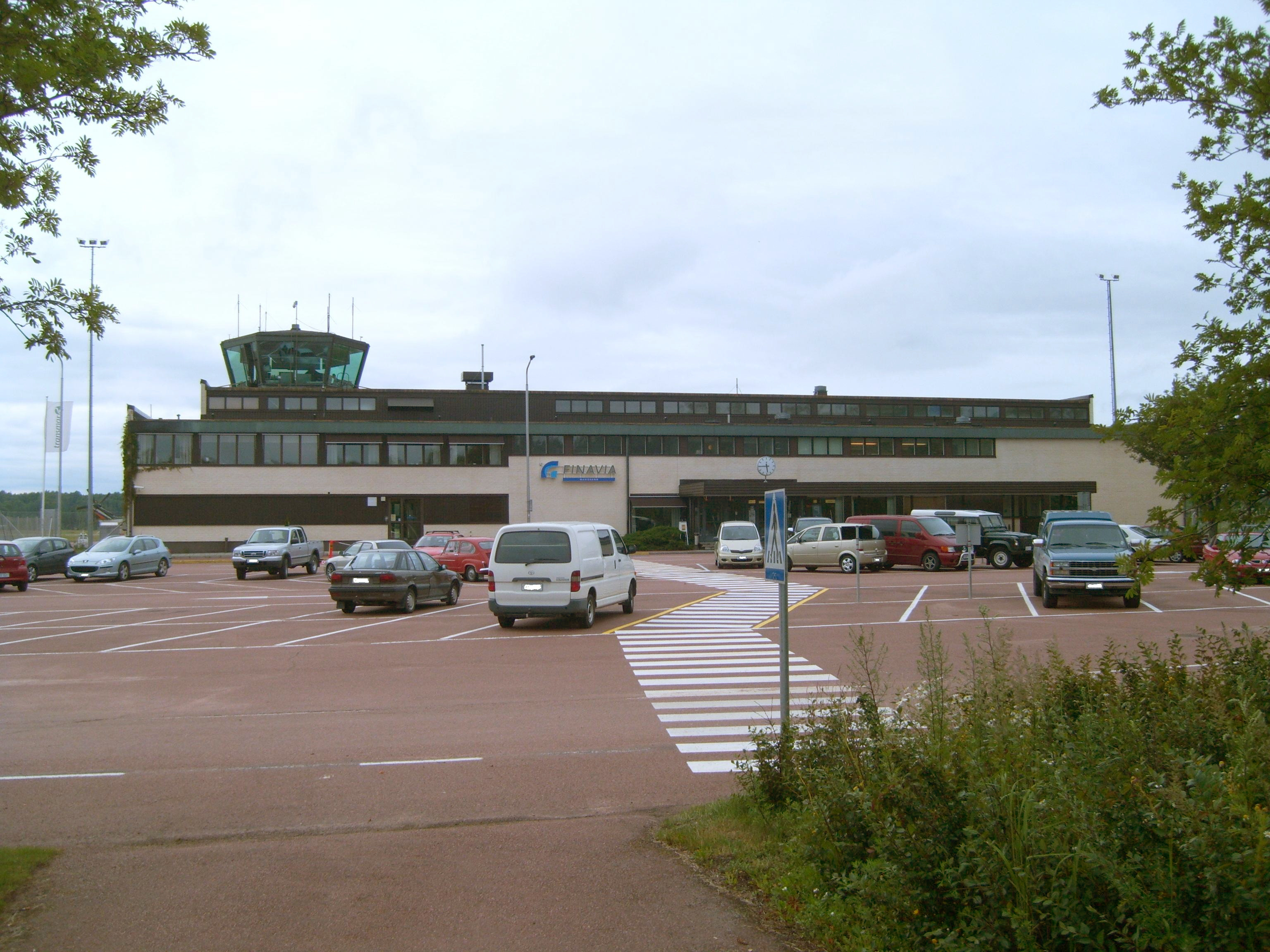
Mariehamn Airport in Jomala.

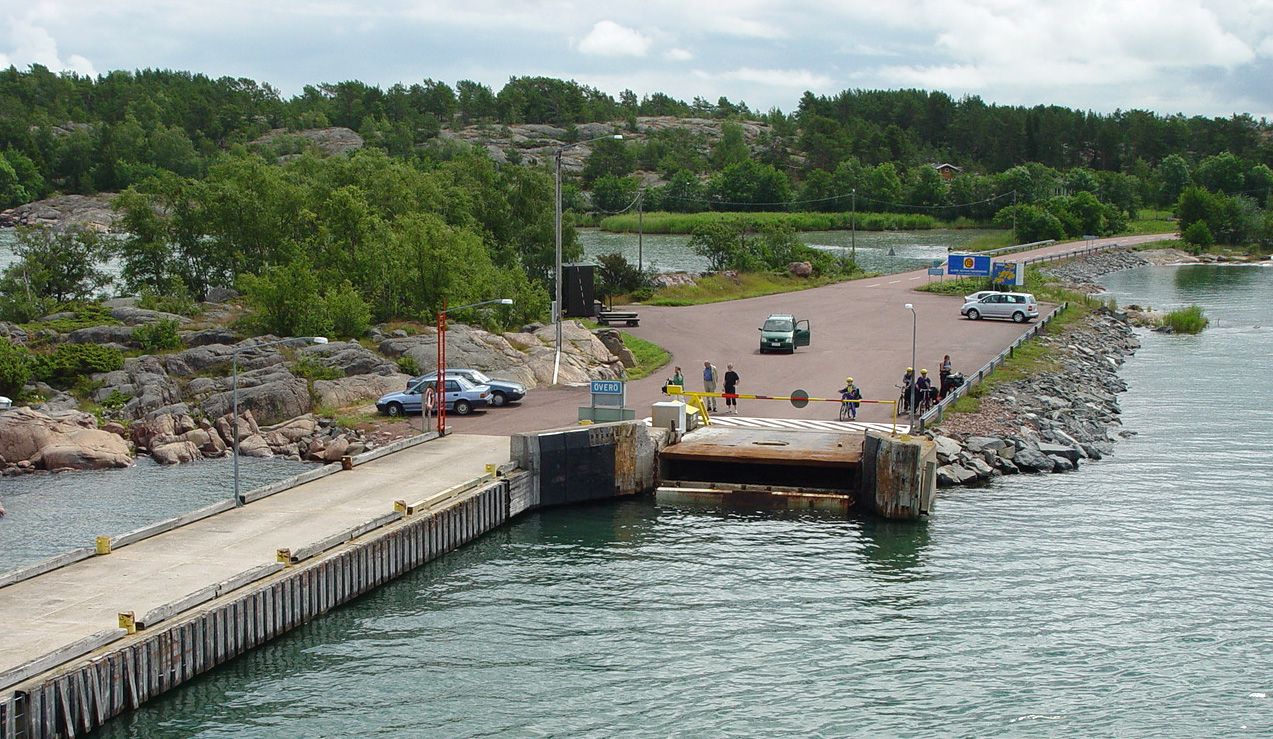
Ferry port in Överö, Föglö.

=== Overview ===
Åland's economy relies heavily on shipping, trade, and tourism. Shipping makes up about 40% of the economy, with several international shipping companies based in Åland. Outside of shipping, most businesses are small, often with fewer than ten employees. Farming and fishing are also important and support a local food industry. A few technology firms contribute to economic growth.

=== Infrastructure and transport ===
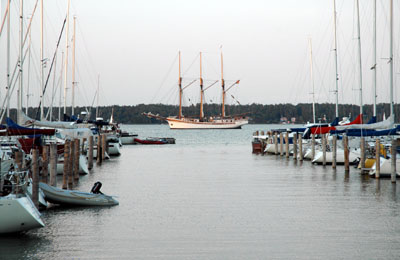
The sailing ship Linden (center) in Östra Hamnen, Mariehamn's eastern port.

Wind power is a growing sector, with plans to reverse the direction of energy transmission to the mainland in the future. In 2023, wind energy supplied 52.2% of Åland's electricity needs.

Major ports include the Western Harbour in Mariehamn, Berghamn in the west, and Långnäs on the eastern shore of the main island. Åland's road network includes four highways: Highway 1 to Eckerö, Highway 2 to Sund, Highway 3 to Lumparland, and Highway 4 to Geta.

Mariehamn was once a hub for the last large commercial sailing ships. These ships, owned by Åland shipowner Gustaf Erikson, carried wheat from Australia to Britain until 1947. After each trip, they returned to Mariehamn to rest and prepare for the next voyage. The Pommern, now a museum ship in Mariehamn, was one of these vessels.

=== Fiscal and tax system ===
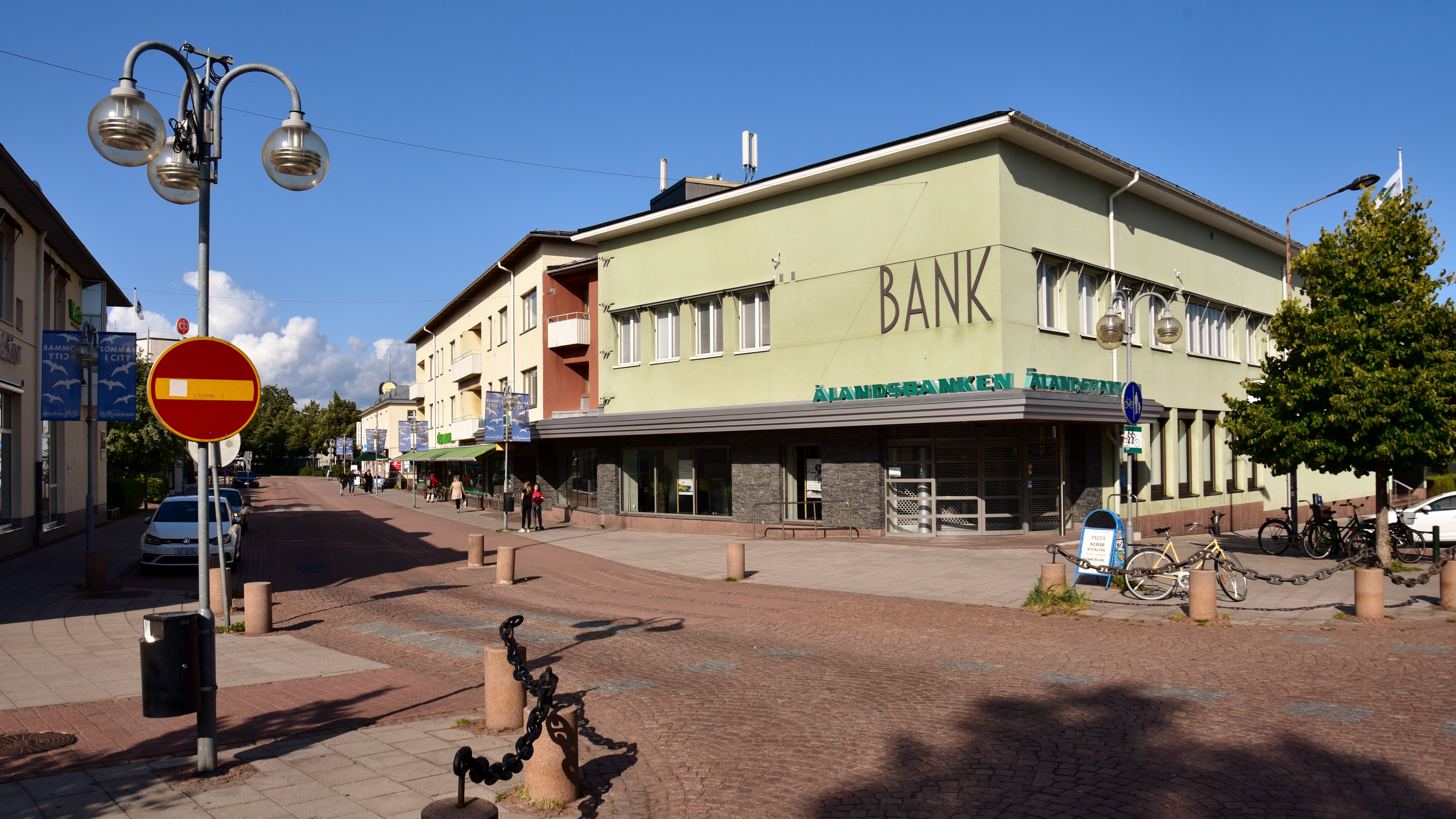
Bank of Åland headquarters in Mariehamn.

When the EU banned duty-free sales on ferries within the union, Finland secured a special exception for Åland. Åland is outside the EU VAT area, which allows tax-free sales on ferries that stop at Mariehamn or Långnäs and at the airport. As a result, Åland is treated as a separate tax zone, and customs duties apply to goods entering the islands. Åland receives about two million visitors each year, with most staying a few hours during ferry stopovers or transfers.

Taxes, fees, and duties are collected in Åland by the Finnish government. In return, the national government allocates funds to the Åland Parliament. This amount is set at 0.5% of total state revenue (excluding loans). If Åland contributes more than 0.5%, the surplus is returned to Åland as "diligence money". In 2010, Åland residents paid 0.7% of all taxes in Finland.

=== Employment and workforce ===
As of January 2025, Åland's unemployment rate was 5.4%. The employment rate was 76.2% in 2011 and 77.9% in 2023.

=== Key industries and enterprises ===
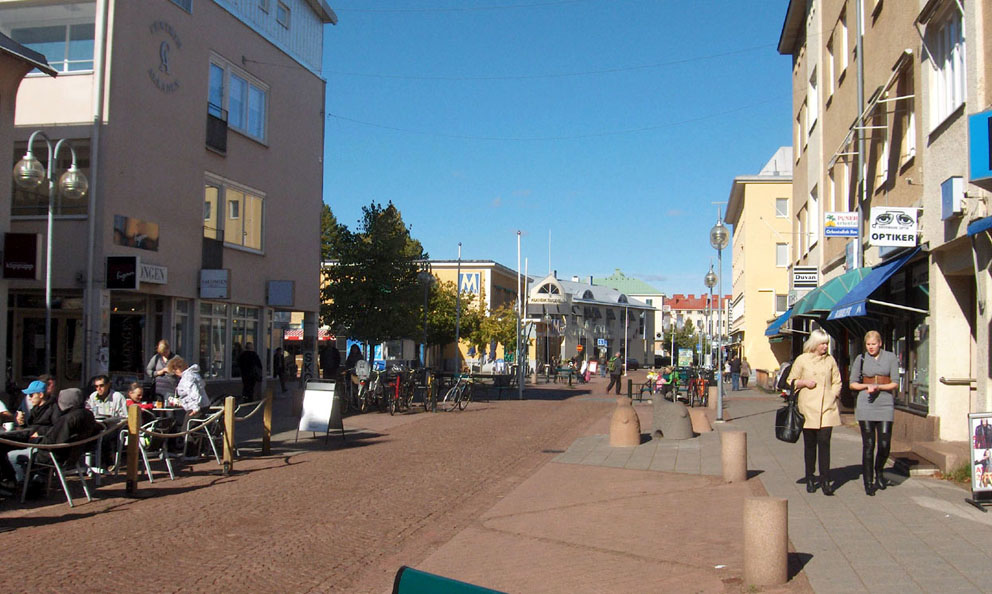
Torggatan, a pedestrian street in Mariehamn.

The euro is the official currency, and many businesses also accept the Swedish krona. In 2006, Eurostat ranked Åland the 20th wealthiest of the EU's 268 regions and the wealthiest in Finland, with GDP per person 47% above the EU average.

Bank of Åland is headquartered in Mariehamn. The government also owns Paf, a gambling operator based in the capital.

=== Economic impact of COVID-19 ===
The COVID-19 pandemic caused a sharper economic decline in Åland than in mainland Finland or Sweden. Since then, Åland's economy has gradually recovered.

== Demographics ==
=== Population ===
Residents by country of origin (2024)
Country	Residents
Finland	24,101
Sweden	3,274
Romania	450
Latvia	405
Thailand	185
Estonia	169
Russia	140
Philippines	128
Germany	124
(Socialist Federal Republic of Yugoslavia) Former Yugoslavia	123
Iran	93
Ukraine	92
United Kingdom	79
United States	66
Poland	64
Norway	56
Morocco	50
Syria	45
Brazil	39
Vietnam	30
Lithuania	26
Other	915
Total	30,654

The population of Åland has grown steadily over the years. The right of domicile is inherited at birth if one or both parents hold it. Immigrants who have lived in Åland for at least five years, hold Finnish citizenship and can demonstrate a sufficient knowledge of Swedish are eligible to apply for this status.

Right of domicile (hembygdsrätt) is required to vote in elections to the Parliament of Åland, stand as a candidate, or own real estate in rural areas.

In 2024, 21% of residents had a foreign background—the highest proportion of any region in Finland. Most came from Sweden (11% of Åland's total population), followed by Romania and Latvia.

Population size 1990–2025
Year	Population
1990	24,604
1995	25,202
2000	25,776
2005	26,766
2010	28,007
2015	28,983
2020	30,129
2025	30,836

=== Languages ===
Languages in Åland (2024)
Language	Percent
Swedish	85.2%
Finnish	4.5%
Romanian	1.7%
Latvian	1.6%
Others	6.9%

Swedish is the sole official language of Åland and was spoken as a first language by 85% of the population in 2024. Fewer than 5% spoke Finnish. In publicly funded schools, the language of instruction is Swedish. In the rest of Finland, bilingual municipalities provide instruction in both Finnish and Swedish. For details on the local dialect, see Åland Swedish.

The ethnic classification of Ålanders remains a subject of debate. They are sometimes described as ethnic Swedes or as part of the Swedish-speaking population of Finland. Linguistically, the Åland dialect is closer to the Uppland dialects of eastern Sweden than to mainland Finland Swedish, though this distinction is not universally agreed upon.

=== Age structure ===
Population by sex and age group (31 December 2024)
Age group	Male	Female	Total	%
Total	15,039	15,198	30,237	100.0
0–14	2,435	2,417	4,852	15.8
15–64	9,274	9,009	18,283	59.7
65+	3,475	4,044	7,519	24.5

== Education ==
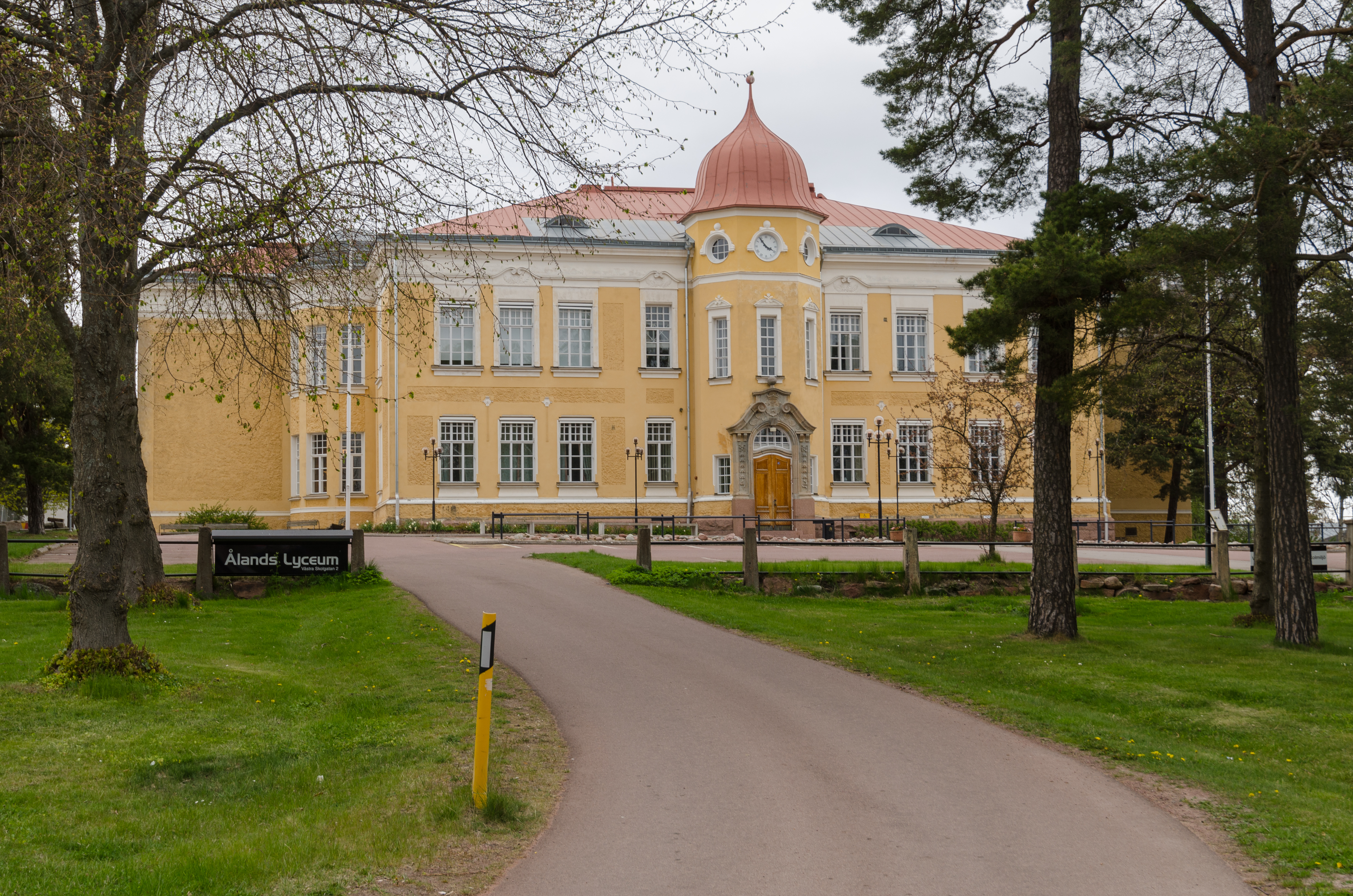
Ålands lyceum, a gymnasium in Mariehamn.

In 2010, Åland had 22 primary schools. Twelve were lower-level schools (grades 1–6), eight included both lower and upper secondary education, and two were upper secondary schools only.

Post-primary education is provided by two main institutions: Ålands lyceum, a traditional academic upper secondary school (gymnasium), and the Åland Vocational School, which offers a dual program combining general and vocational studies. According to 2018 statistics from the Finnish education authority, Ålands lyceum had 432 students enrolled.

Other institutions include Ålands folkhögskola and several additional primary and secondary schools across the islands.

Higher education is offered by the Åland University of Applied Sciences, which enrolls around 600 students. Fields of study include maritime studies, mechanical and electrical engineering, information technology, business, hospitality, and health care. All maritime education is coordinated through the Alandica Shipping Academy.

The education system in Åland follows the Finnish and broader Nordic model. The official language of instruction is Swedish. Finnish has traditionally been compulsory in upper secondary schools and optional at the primary level. As of 2006, about 80% of primary students chose to study Finnish. That year, a proposal was made to remove Finnish as a compulsory subject in upper secondary schools.

== Religion ==
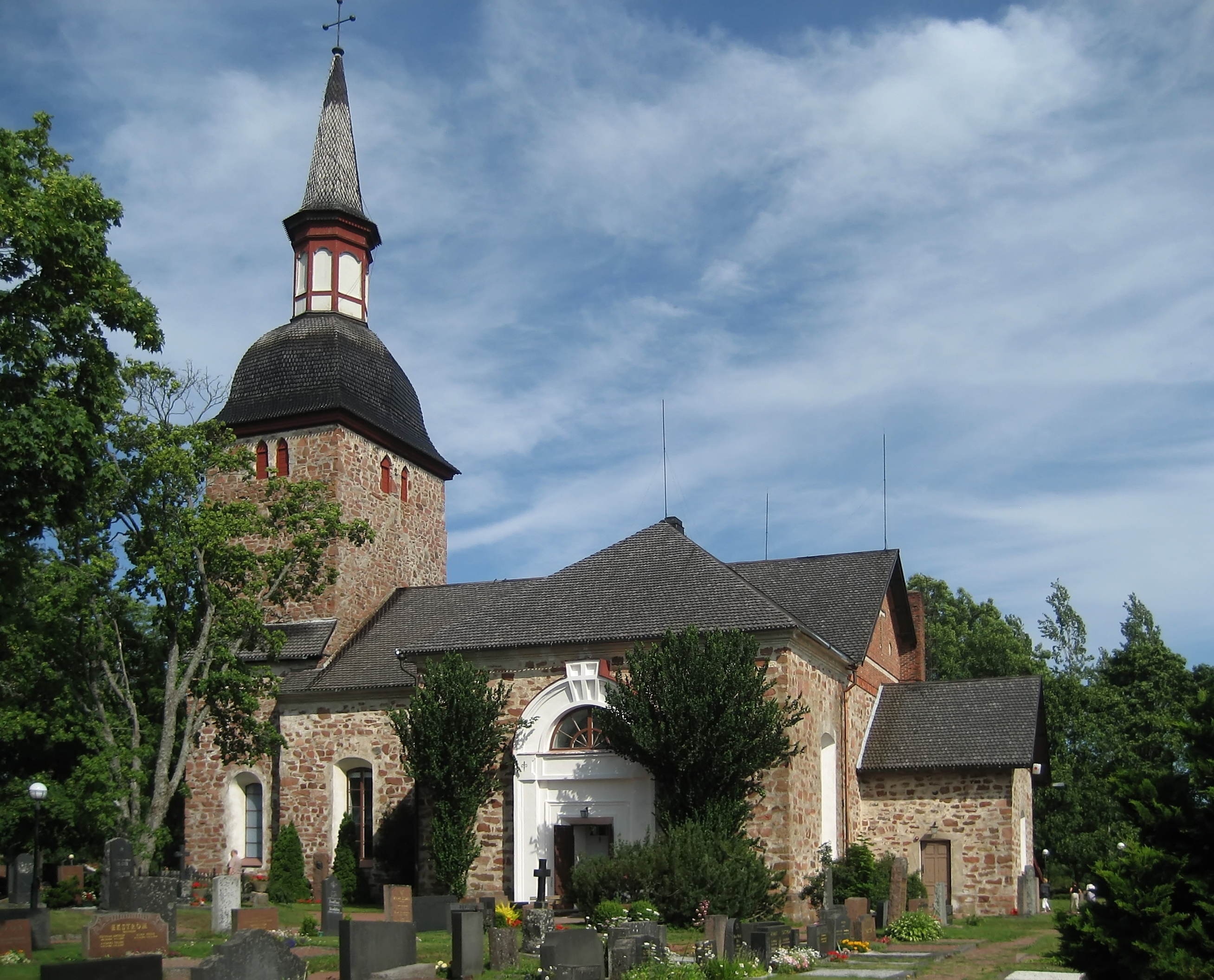
St. Olaf's Church in Jomala, the oldest in Åland.

As of 2020, 70.5% of Åland's population were members of the Evangelical Lutheran Church of Finland.

Åland has some of the oldest churches in Finland. St. Olaf's Church in Jomala, built in the late 13th century, is generally considered the oldest surviving church building in the country.

The largest medieval church in Åland is the Church of St. John the Baptist, located in Sund. Built shortly after St. Olaf's, it remains one of the most significant historical churches in the region.

The Baptists arrived in Åland from Sweden as early as the 1850s; the first congregation was founded in Föglö in 1856.

== Culture ==
=== Literature ===
Writers from Åland include Anni Blomqvist, known for her five-volume series Stormskärs Maja, and Sally Salminen, whose 1936 novel Katrina received international recognition. Ulla-Lena Lundberg has also written about her native Kökar. Many of these works are set in Åland.

=== Cinema and television ===
The 2016 historical drama film Devil's Bride, directed by Saara Cantell, is set in 17th-century Åland during the witch trials. The film received the Best Foreign Language Film Award at the 2017 Female Eye Film Festival in Toronto.

Another film set in Åland is the 2013 drama Disciple, directed by Ulrika Bengts. The film has been covered in Finnish-language media, including an archived feature from Uusi Suomi about Bengts's career path, and a DVD review in Elokuvauutiset.

=== Sport ===
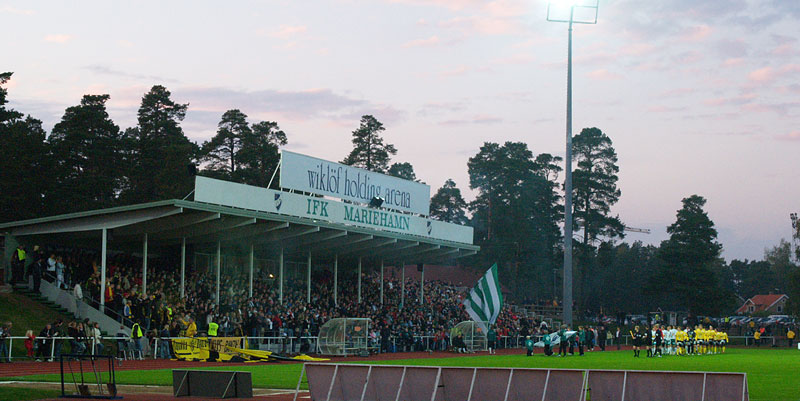
Wiklöf Holding Arena, home stadium of IFK Mariehamn.

The Åland national football team competes in the biennial Island Games, which Åland hosted in 1991 and 2009. Åland also hosted the 1974 and 1977 editions of the Women's Nordic Football Championship. The Åland Football Association organizes football activities, including the Ålandscupen (Åland Cup) for local clubs.

The main football clubs are Åland United (women's) and IFK Mariehamn (men's), the latter of which plays in the Veikkausliiga, Finland's top league. Both teams play at the Wiklöf Holding Arena in Mariehamn.

Other clubs include:

- FC Åland
- IF Finströms Kamraterna
- IF Fram
- Lemlands IF

Åland hosted the following editions of the women's curling tournament Paf Masters in Eckerö:

- 2017 Paf Masters Tour
- 2018 Paf Masters Tour

The Åland Stags is the only rugby union club on the islands. Disc golf is also widely played.

=== Heraldry ===
The coat of arms of Åland shows a golden red deer on a blue field, traditionally topped with a comital coronet. The same arms were mistakenly granted to the Swedish province of Öland in 1560.

== Notable people ==
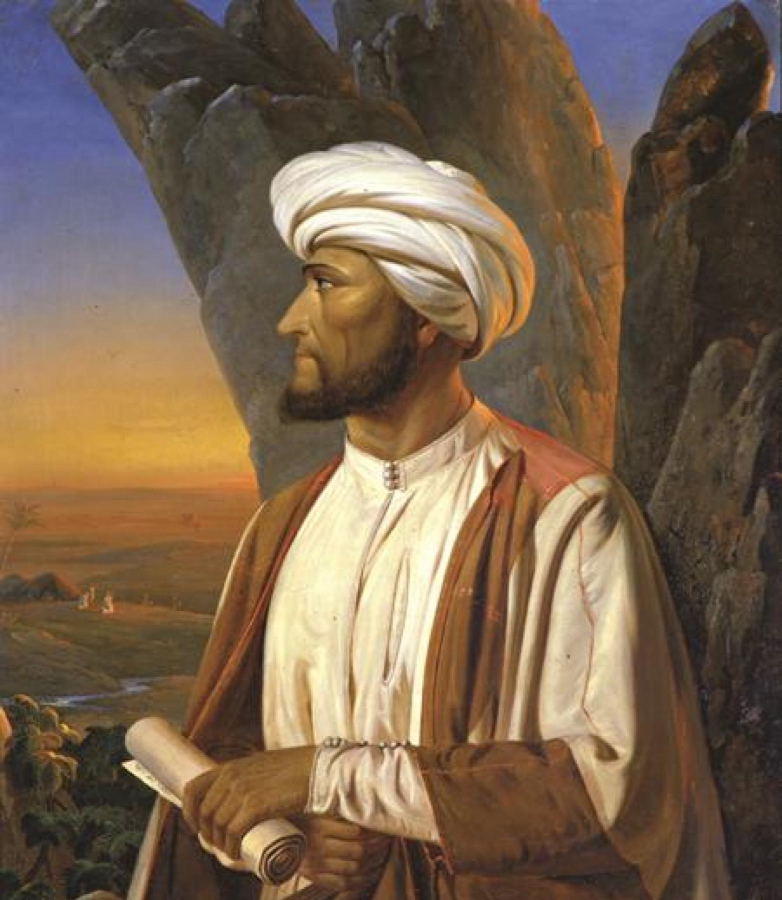
Georg August Wallin.

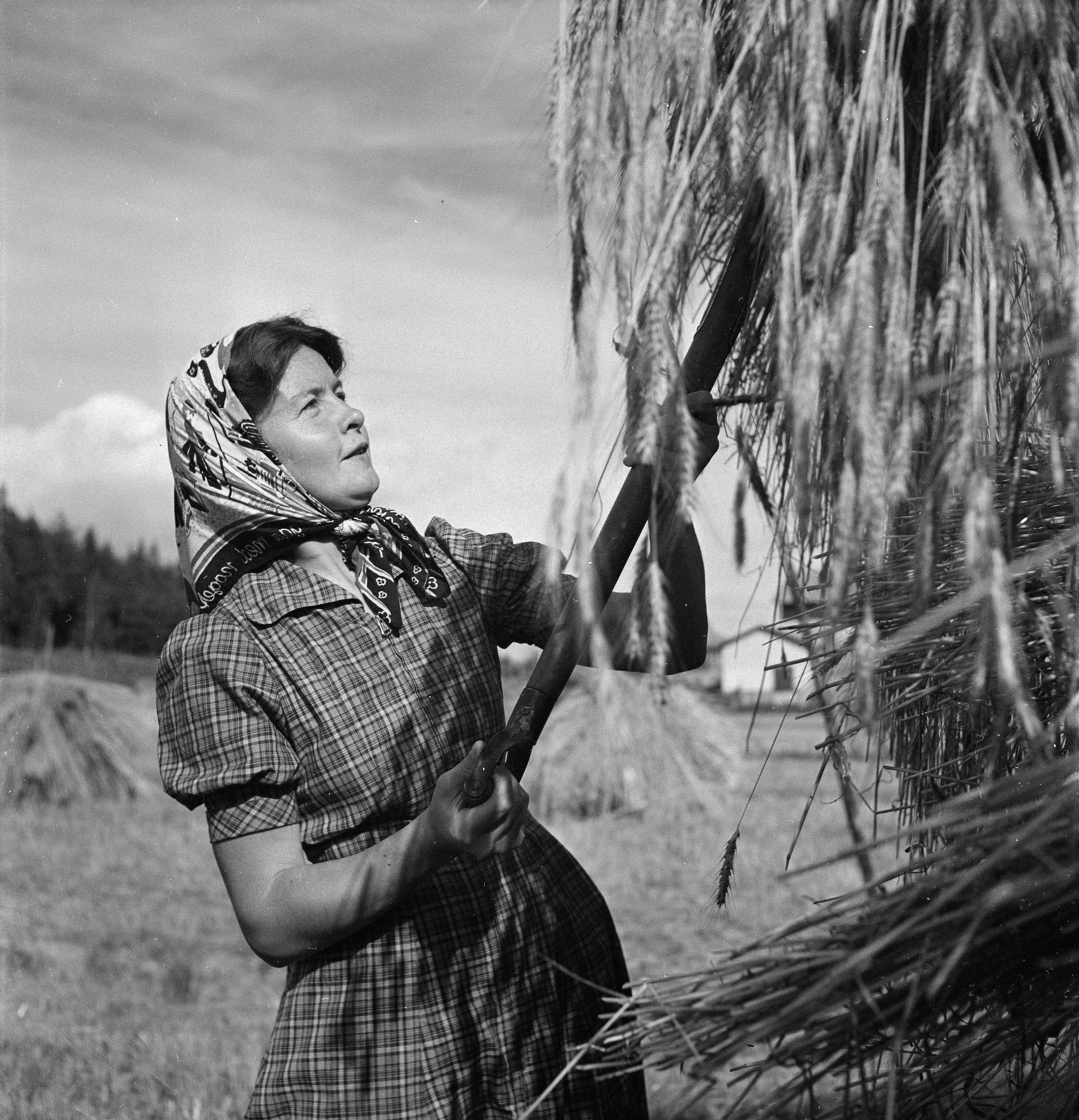
Sally Salminen.

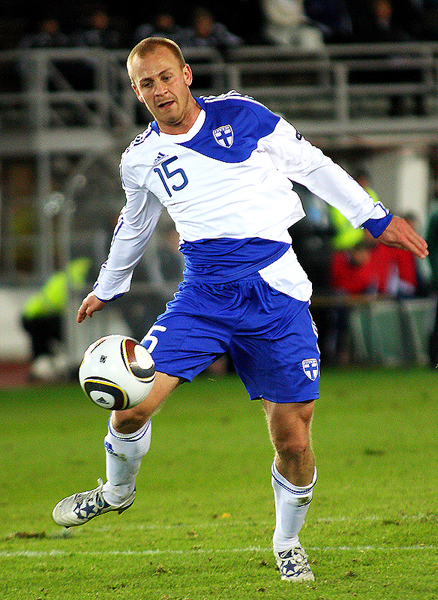
Daniel Sjölund.

- Sara Holmsten (1713–1795), writer
- Frans Peter von Knorring (1792–1875), priest and social reformer
- Georg August Wallin (1811–1852), explorer and orientalist
- Kaj Himberg (1844–1927), polymath
- Karl Emanuel Jansson (1846–1874), painter
- Robert Mattson (1851–1935), shipowner and businessman
- Gustaf Erikson (1872–1947), shipowner known for his windjammer fleet
- Nicken Rönngren (1880–1956), theatre director
- Joel Pettersson (1892–1937), painter and author
- Atos Wirtanen (1906–1979), politician and journalist
- Sally Salminen (1906–1976), author; three-time Nobel Prize in Literature nominee
- Ture Bengtz (1907–1973), Finnish-American Expressionist artist
- Ville Salminen (1908–1992), film actor and director
- Anni Blomqvist (1909–1990), novelist
- Jaakko Suolahti (1918–1987), classical scholar
- Pehr Henrik Nordgren (1944–2008), composer
- Ulla-Lena Lundberg (born 1947), author
- Peter Lindbäck (born 1955), Governor of Åland (1999–present)
- Stefan Lindfors (born 1962), industrial designer and sculptor
- Veronica Thörnroos (born 1962), politician; head of government since 2019
- Jeremy Duns (born 1973), British author of spy fiction

=== Sport ===
- Kaarlo Mäkinen (1892–1980), Olympic freestyle wrestler (1924, 1928)
- Frej Liewendahl (1902–1966), Olympic gold medallist in track and field (1924)
- Johan Hellström (1907–1989), Olympic boxer (1928)
- Daniel Sjölund (born 1983), footballer (380 club and 37 national appearances)
- Annica Sjölund (born 1985), footballer (67 national appearances)
- Robert Helenius (born 1984), professional heavyweight boxer
- Adelina Engman (born 1994), footballer (84 national appearances)

== See also ==
- Åland's Autonomy Day
- Battle of Åland Islands
- Flag of Åland
- Provincial Governors of Finland
- Bibliography of the Åland Islands
- Index of Åland-related articles
- Outline of the Åland Islands
