= Disciple (film) =

2013 film

- Original Swedish film poster
- Directed by: Ulrika Bengts
- Written by: Roland Fauser; Jimmy Karlsson
- Produced by: Mats Långbacka
- Starring: Niklas Groundstroem
- Cinematography: Robert Nordström
- Distributed by: Långfilm Productions
- Release date: 27 September 2013
- Running time: 80 minutes
- Country: Finland
- Language: Swedish

Disciple (Swedish: Lärjungen) is a 2013 Finnish Swedish-language drama film directed by Ulrika Bengts. It tells the story of a stern lighthouse chief living on the Lågskär Island, who takes a 13-year-old boy who grew up in a approved school as his apprentice. As the boy shows more and more competence for the given task, the lighthouse chief begins to reveal his cruel traits.

The film was selected as the Finnish entry for the Best Foreign Language Film at the 86th Academy Awards, but it was not nominated.

== Cast ==
- Niklas Groundstroem as Lighthouse Chief Hasselbond
- Patrik Kumpulainen as Gustaf Hasselbond
- Erik Lönngren as Karl Berg
- Amanda Ooms as Dorrit Hasselbond
- Sampo Sarkola as Lecturer Ajander
- Ping Mon Wallén as Emma Hasselbond
- Philip Zandén as Captain Hallström
- Alfons Röblom as Sköld

== See also ==
- List of submissions to the 86th Academy Awards for Best Foreign Language Film
- List of Finnish submissions for the Academy Award for Best Foreign Language Film
