= Sottunga =

- Municipality
- Sottunga kommun
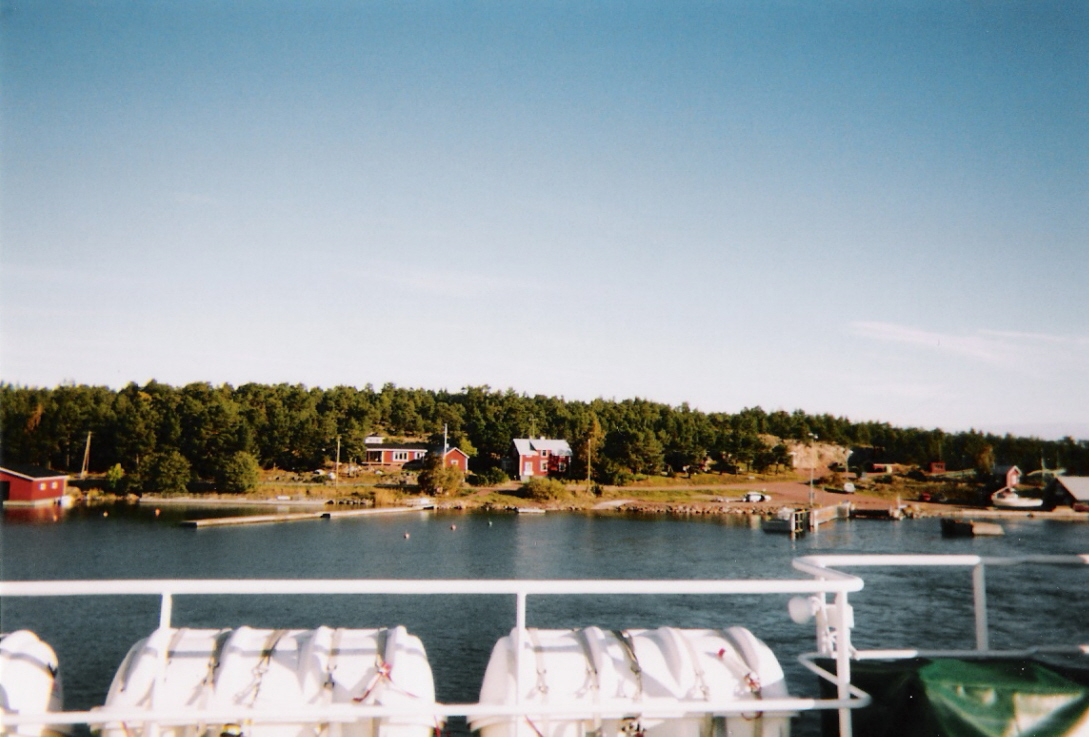
- The southern end of Storsottunga as seen from a passing ferry in 2004

- Coat of arms

- Location of Sottunga in Finland

- Location in Åland
- Coordinates: 60°08′N 020°40′E
- Country: Finland
- Region: Åland
- Sub-region: Archipelago
- Charter: 1959

Government
  - Municipal manager: Christer von Essen

Area (2018-01-01)
  - Total: 342.44 km^{2} (132.22 sq mi)
  - Land: 28.03 km^{2} (10.82 sq mi)
  - Water: 314.41 km^{2} (121.39 sq mi)
  - Rank: 310th largest in Finland

Population (2025-12-31)
  - Total: 101
  - Rank: 308th largest in Finland
  - Density: 3.6/km^{2} (9.3/sq mi)

Population by native language
  - Swedish: 96.9% (official)
  - Others: 3.1%

Population by age
  - 0 to 14: 10.9%
  - 15 to 64: 52.5%
  - 65 or older: 36.6%
- Time zone: UTC+02:00 (EET)
  - Summer (DST): UTC+03:00 (EEST)
- Website: www.sottunga.ax

Sottunga is an island municipality of Åland, an autonomous territory of Finland. The municipality is the smallest when it comes to population in Åland and in Finland, with a population of only 101 (31 December 2025) and covers an area of 342.44 square kilometres (132.22 sq mi) of which 314.41 km^{2} (121.39 sq mi) is water. The population density is 3.6 inhabitants per square kilometre (9.3/sq mi). The municipality is unilingually Swedish, with 96.9% of the inhabitants speaking Swedish as their native language. Sottunga comprises many islands, of which only three, Husö, Finnö and Storsottunga, are inhabited. Storsottunga is usually called Sottunga. There are five villages in the municipality: Finnö, Husö, Hästö, Mosshaga and Sottunga. The highest point of Sottunga is Kasberget (25 m).

Sottunga can be reached by ferry from Långnäs in Lumparland and Galtby in Korpo and many ferries pass the island without making a stop.

== History ==
Like the rest of Eastern Åland, Sottunga got its first permanent inhabitants sometime in the 11th century, although there is evidence that the island had had inhabitants long before that. The name Sottunga itself is thought to predate the 11th century. In the 17th century there were some ten households on the island and about 70 inhabitants.

Sottunga has suffered during many wars, first during the Great Northern War in 1714–22 when all of Åland fled to Sweden and again during the Finnish War of 1808-09 when all the buildings on the island were set on fire in order to prevent them from falling into enemy hands. In 1800, before the Finnish War, the island had been visited by King Gustav IV Adolf of Sweden. Later during the Winter War of 1939–40 the island was bombed by the Soviet Union. The bombs were responsible for the sinking of the cargo ship SS Notung in 1940 just northeast of Sottunga.

The population of Sottunga reached its peak in the 1920s with about 400 inhabitants from which it has gradually declined during the 20th century.

== Economy ==
Sottunga does not have many inhabitants and so the island has only one bank, one post office, one primary school and one healthcare center. Only 1.54 km^{2} (0.59 sq mi) is cultivated and commercial fishing is not practised anymore. The industry of the island is dominated by dairy products and the cultivation of sugar beet.

== Sights ==
The church of Sottunga was originally built in 1661. The modern church on the site was built in 1728 after a fire had destroyed the original one. It is the smallest wooden church in Finland. Its clock tower was built in 1770 and the building was renovated in 1802. The painting at the altar was made by P. Berggren in Stockholm, Sweden, in 1845.

Before the church was built Sottunga had a chapel which was built in 1544 and which was approximately one kilometer away from the contemporary church.

On the island of Södö there are old mines dating back to the 19th century. Only 1,700 tons of iron ore were ever mined between the years 1839 and 1847 when the mines were operating.
