= Flag of Åland =

Åland
- Use: Civil and state flag, civil and state ensign
- Proportion: 17:26
- Adopted: 1954
- Design: A red Nordic cross fimbriated in yellow on a blue field

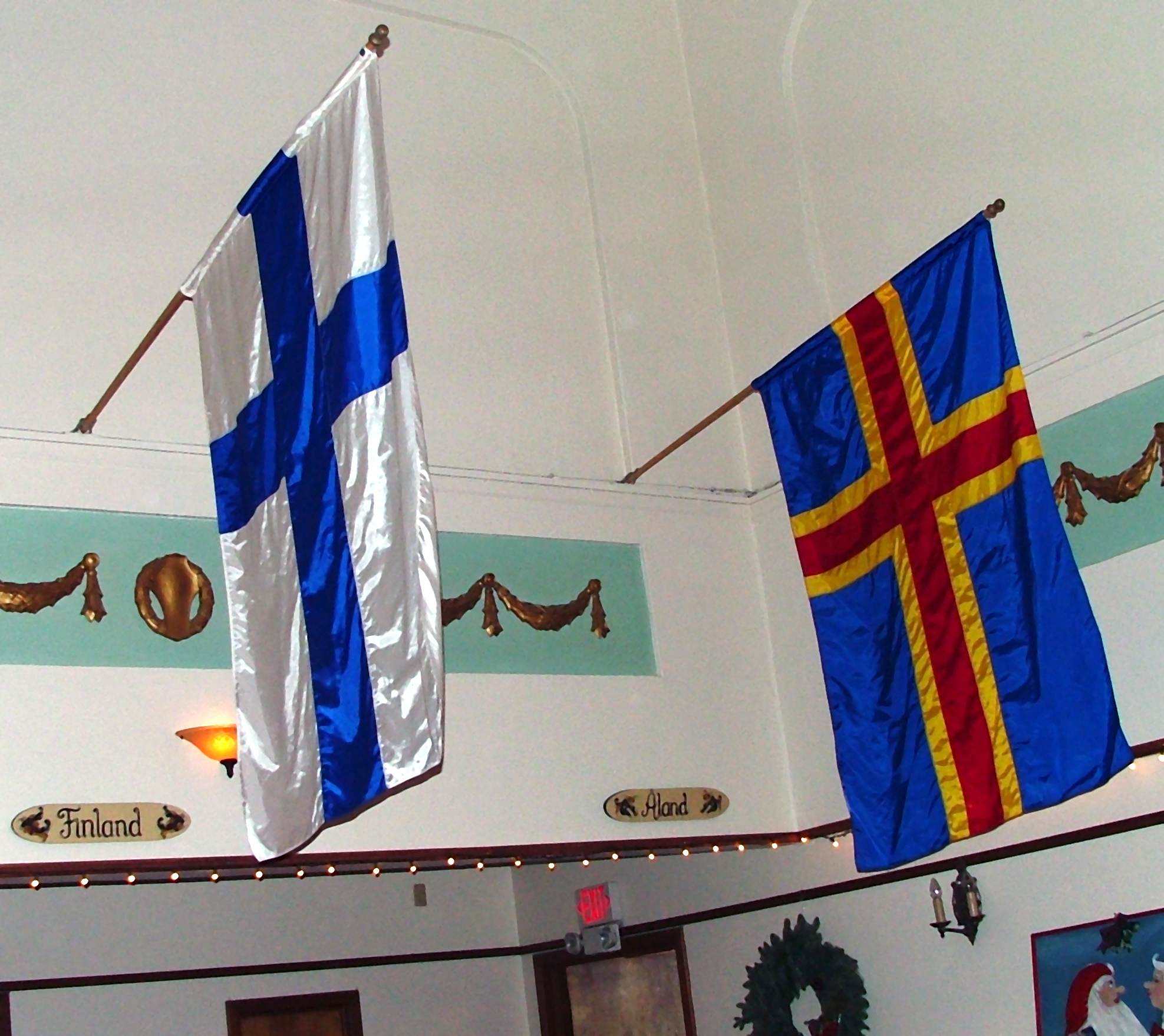
The flag of Åland displayed alongside the flag of Finland.

The flag of Åland (Swedish: Ålands flagga; Finnish: Ahvenanmaan lippu) is a Nordic cross featuring a red cross fimbriated in yellow on a blue field, with the vertical arm shifted toward the hoist. In vexillological terms, it resembles the Swedish flag modified by the addition of a red cross symbolising Finland.

The flag was officially adopted in 1954 and was first hoisted in Mariehamn on 3 April of that year. Prior to autonomy, an unofficial horizontal blue–yellow–blue triband was in use until it was prohibited in 1935. The last Sunday of April is observed in Åland as an official flag day dedicated to the regional flag.

== History ==
When Finland gained independence from Russia in 1917, many Ålanders feared the loss of their Swedish cultural identity and language. This concern led to a movement advocating reunification with Sweden. The resulting dispute was referred to the League of Nations, which decided in favour of Ålander autonomy under Finnish sovereignty.

During the early 1920s, Åland unofficially used a blue and yellow tricolour flag, which was banned by the Finnish government in 1935. In 1952, legislation granted Åland the right to adopt its own flag. An initial proposal resembling the Swedish flag with a blue cross was rejected by the President, Juho Kusti Paasikivi. The final design adopted a red cross within the Nordic cross to represent Finland.

== Colours ==
The official colours of the Åland flag are defined in the Landskapsförordning (2004:15) om riktlinjer för Ålands flaggas färger. The regulation specifies the colours using the Natural Color System (NCS), with a tolerance of ±5 NCS units for hue and chromaticity. Pantone and CMYK values are provided as approximate equivalents.

Colour model	Blue	Yellow	Red
NCS	3065-R90B	0580-Y10R	1085-Y90R
Pantone	2945C / 300U	116C / 109U	186C / 185U
CMYK	100-54-2-0	0-16-100-0	6-100-100-0

== Gallery ==
Unofficial tricolour used from the early 1920s until 1935

Original proposed flag design

Matts Dreijer's 1939 proposal

The "Pestflaggan"

Matts Dreijer's 1946 proposal

Debate proposal 1

Debate proposal 2

Debate proposal 3

"Finnish" flag proposal

== See also ==
- Åland's Autonomy Day
- Coat of arms of Åland
