= Baby (Royal Republic song) =

Single by Royal Republic

from the album Weekend Man
- Released: 15 January 2016
- Recorded: July–August 2015
- Studio: Fuzzfactory
- Genre: Hard rock; rock and roll; blues rock
- Length: 2:53
- Label: Capitol; Spinefarm
- Songwriters: Jonas Almén; Per Andreasson; Adam Grahn; Hannes Irengård
- Producer: Christian Neander

Royal Republic singles chronology
"When I See You Dance With Another" (2015)	"Baby" (2016)	"Uh Huh" (2016)

Music video
- "Baby" on YouTube

"Baby" is a song by Swedish rock band, Royal Republic. It was released as the second single from their third studio album, Weekend Man. The single was released along with a music video on 15 January 2016.

The single was the first song by the band to chart, and the first work of theirs to chart in the United States. "Baby" reached number 15 in the U.S. Mainstream Rock chart and number 38 in the Rock Airplay chart in September 2017.

== Critical reception ==
In a staff article for KDOT, they described the track as having "a a distinctly 70's rock sound that was common right before the big hair movement".

== Music video ==
A music video was released alongside the single on 15 January 2016. The video features the band performing at a roller disco. In an interview with Louder Sound, the band described the music video as "super speed roller disco thunder show".

== Live performances ==
The band recorded a live version of the track on 3 June 2016 at Crypt Studio in London.

== Charts ==
Chart (2016–2017)	Peak position
US Mainstream Rock (Billboard)	15
US Rock & Alternative Airplay (Billboard)	38
