= Anteros (disambiguation) =

Anteros was the god of requited love in Greek mythology.

Anteros may also refer to:

- Anteros (butterfly), a genus of butterflies
- Anteros Coachworks Inc., an American sports car manufacturer
- 1943 Anteros, an asteroid
- Eros|Anteros, a 2013 album by Belgian band Oathbreaker
- Anteros (band), a London-based band

== See also ==
- Pope Anterus, a 3rd-century pope
- Antergos, a Linux distribution
