= LoveCop =

Studio album by Royal Republic
- Released: 7 June 2024
- Genre: Alternative rock; dance-rock; disco rock; funk rock; hard rock
- Length: 35:13
- Label: OMN Label Services

Royal Republic chronology
Club Majesty (2019)	LoveCop (2024)

Singles from LoveCop
- 1. "My House" Released: 2024; 2. "LoveCop" Released: 2024; 3. "Lazerlove" Released: 2024; 4. "Ain't Got Time" Released: 2024; 5. "Wow! Wow! Wow!" Released: 2024

Professional ratings
Review scores
Source	Rating
Moshville	4/5 stars
Distorted Sound	9/10 stars
Maximum Volume Music	9/10 stars
Classic Rock	4/5 stars
Caligepo	4/5 stars

LoveCop is the fifth studio album by Swedish rock band Royal Republic. The album was released on 7 June 2024 through OMN Label Services and follows their 2019 release Club Majesty.

The record continues Royal Republic's evolution towards a dance- and disco-infused rock sound, while retaining elements of alternative rock and hard rock.

== Track listing ==
All songs are written by Royal Republic.

No.	Title	Length
1.	"Intro My House"	0:25
2.	"My House"	3:14
3.	"LoveCop"	4:09
4.	"Wow! Wow! Wow!"	3:40
5.	"Freakshow"	3:57
6.	"Lazerlove"	4:18
7.	"Boots"	2:38
8.	"Love Somebody"	2:34
9.	"Ain't Got Time"	2:41
10.	"Electra"	4:15
11.	"Sha-La-La-Lady"	3:18
Total length:		35:13

== Personnel ==
Royal Republic

- Jonas Almén – bass, vocals
- Per Andreasson – drums, vocals
- Adam Grahn – lead vocals, guitar
- Hannes Irengård – guitar, vocals

Production

- Adam Grahn – production
- Michael Ilbert – production, mixing
- Björn Engelmann – mastering
- Leo Åkesson – artwork
- Christopher Landin – artwork
- Odyssey Music Network – management
