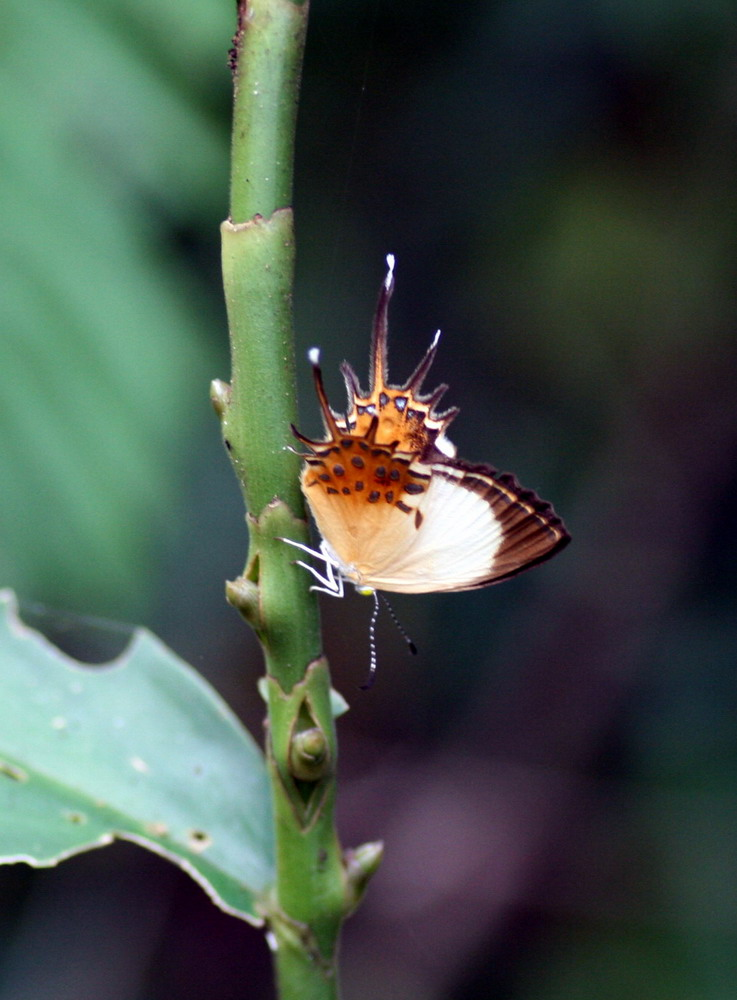
- Helicopis cupido

Scientific classification
- Kingdom: Animalia
- Phylum: Arthropoda
- Clade: Pancrustacea
- Class: Insecta
- Order: Lepidoptera
- Family: Riodinidae
- Subfamily: Riodininae
- Tribe: Helicopini; Reuter 1897

Genera
- See text

= Helicopini =

Tribe of butterflies

The Helicopini are a tribe of metalmark butterflies (family Riodinidae).

== Genera ==
- Anteros Hübner, [1819]
- Helicopis Fabricius, 1807
- Ourocnemis Baker, 1887
- Sarota Westwood, [1851]

As numerous Riodinidae genera have not yet been unequivocally assigned to a tribe, the genus list is preliminary. In fact, it is likely that the bulk of the Riodinidae incertae sedis belongs into this group.
