= Uh Huh =

Uh Huh or variants may refer to:

== Music ==
=== Albums ===
- Uh Huh (The Jazz Crusaders album), 1967
- Uh Huh! (EP), by Queen's Band, 2009
- Uh-huh, by John Mellencamp, 1983

=== Songs ===
- "Uh Huh" (B2K song), 2001
- "Uh Huh" (Julia Michaels song), 2017
- "Uh Huh" (Royal Republic song), 2016
- "U-Huh" (song), by Tkay Maidza, 2014
- "Uh Huh", a song by Zzbra from the album Zzbra: Original Motion Picture Soundtrack, 2012
- Uh-Huh, by fictional band Munchausen by Proxy, 2008

== Other uses ==
- Uh-Huh, played by John Collum
- "Uh-huh", see also Yes and no§Colloquial forms
