= Devil's Bride =

Devil's Bride or The Devil's Bride may refer to:

- Devil's Bride (1974 film), a 1974 Lithuanian film
- Devil's Bride (2016 film), a 2016 Finnish film
- The Devil Rides Out (film), a 1968 British film known as The Devil's Bride in the United States
