= Kristina Königsmarck =

Swedish noblewoman and landowner

Kristina Bengtsdotter Königsmarck (died 1485) was a Swedish noblewoman and landowner.

She was born to Bengt Königsmark (died circa 1431), governor of Kalmar Castle (c. 1415–1423), and his second spouse Ingrid Karlsdotter Gädda; she was thus the niece of Ida Königsmarck. She was an heiress and the last of her family line. Kristina Königsmarck became known for the infamous event in which she allegedly murdered a suitor, the nobleman Nils Månsson, in collaboration with her maid and her chaplain, who was also her lover. In 1453, she married the riksråd Gregers Bengtsson (Folkungaättens oäkta gren). She was personally the owner of the estate Stora Benhamra in Vada parish by Vallentuna. Kristina was widowed in 1473 or 1474. She had several children during her marriage, although they all died during childhood. Her daughter Birgitta Gregersdotter (died 1469/1474) became known after being allegedly cured by a miracle of Catherine of Vadstena.
