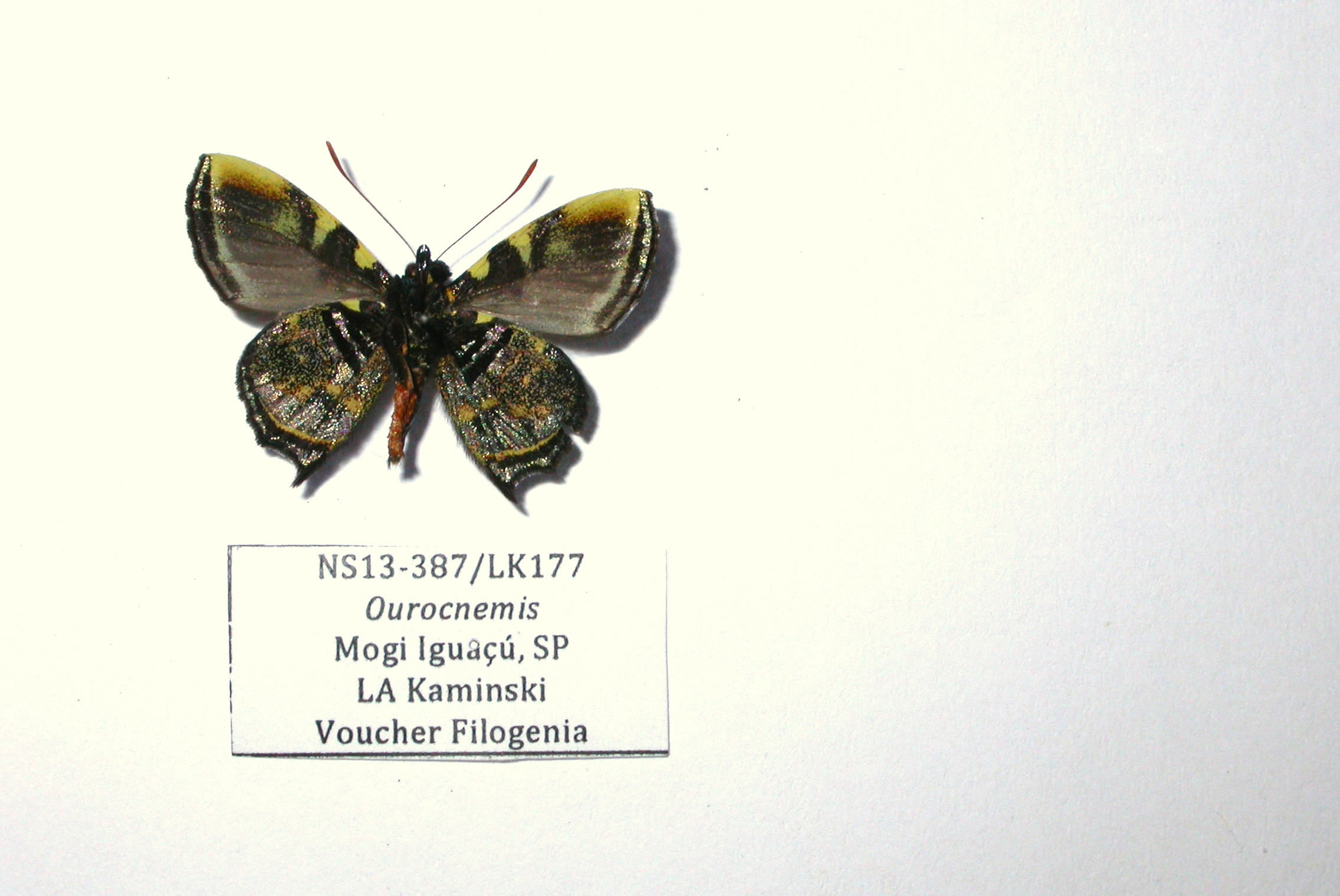
- Mounted Ourocnemis from Brazil

Scientific classification
- Kingdom: Animalia
- Phylum: Arthropoda
- Clade: Pancrustacea
- Class: Insecta
- Order: Lepidoptera
- Family: Riodinidae
- Subfamily: Riodininae
- Tribe: Helicopini
- Genus: Ourocnemis; Baker, 1887

Type species
- Anteros axiochus Hewitson, 1867

= Ourocnemis =

Genus of butterflies

Ourocnemis is a genus of butterflies.

== Description ==
Ourocnemis was first described by George T. Baker in the 1887 edition of The Transactions of the Entomological Society of London. Members of this genus have robust bodies, heads that are squared with their bodies, and labial palpi that are deflated or clubbed. Their antennae are brown. All six of their stout legs are covered in long hairy tufts; the fifth segment on the middle pair of legs having especially long tufts.

== Taxonomy ==
Ourocnemis contains the following species:

- Ourocnemis archytas Le Cerf, 1911
- Ourocnemis boulleti (Stoll, 1791)
