= Kastelholm witch trials =

Finnish trial and executions

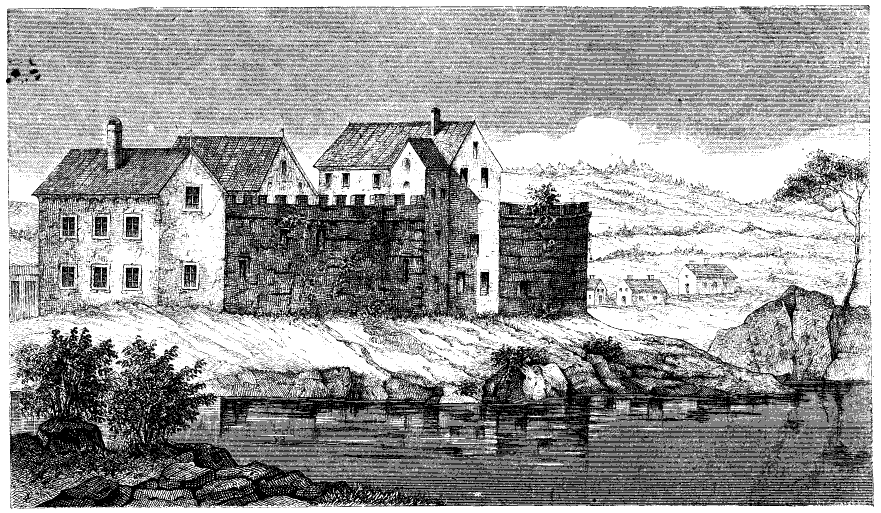
Kastelholm Castle in the 17th century

The Kastelholm witch trials were witch trials held in Kastelholm, Åland between 1665 and 1668, the witch trials were the biggest witch trials in the history of Finland. It was also almost unique in its character for Finland, where witch trials were normally small, with a single and often male defendant accused of sorcery. In contrast, the Kastelholm witch trials were a mass trial where several women were accused of attending a Witches' Sabbath and making a pact with the Devil in the manner of contemporary continental witchcraft demonology, and in both instances it was almost unique for Finland, where only the Ostrobothnia witch trials of 1674-1678 were similar to it. It resulted in the execution of six women.

== History ==
The witch trials were conducted by the new governor Nils Psilander, who was educated in Tartu and who investigated witchcraft on the island in accordance with the witchcraft demonology he had been taught at the German university of Dorpat, where witchcraft demonology was an important subject at that point. After having received a normal case about sorcery, which had customarily not been associated with the Devil and resolved with fines, he chose to conduct it according to the way such cases were conducted in Germany, taking the accused to Kastelholm Castle and forcing them to confess to attending Witches' Sabbath and making a pact with the Devil and subjected to torture to point out their accomplices. This spiraled into a witch trial of a kind which was new to Åland and Finland and resulted in the execution of six women before dying out in 1668.

== In popular culture ==
The trial is the subject of the 2016 film Devil's Bride, directed by Saara Cantell.
