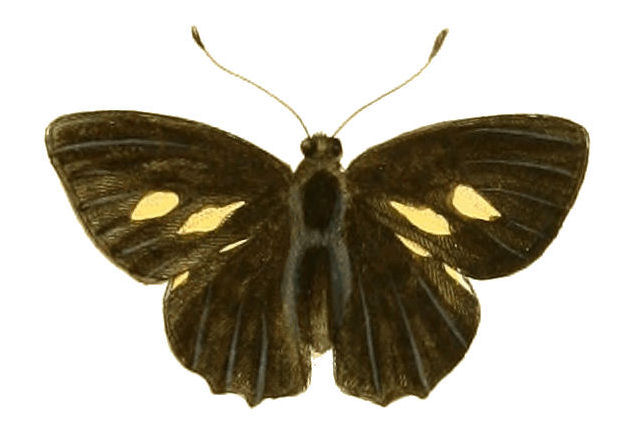
- Anteros acheus ampyx, dorsal view
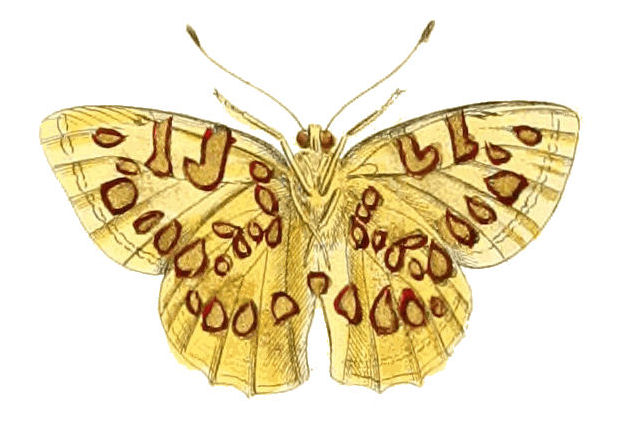
- Ventral view

Scientific classification
- Kingdom: Animalia
- Phylum: Arthropoda
- Class: Insecta
- Order: Lepidoptera
- Family: Riodinidae
- Genus: Anteros
- Species: A. acheus

Binomial name
- Anteros acheus (Stoll, 1781)

Synonyms
- Papilio acheus Stoll, 1781; Papilio ampyx Drury, 1782

= Anteros acheus =

Species of butterfly

Anteros acheus is a species of butterfly of the family Riodinidae, found in Brazil, Suriname and Bolivia. It was first described by Caspar Stoll in 1781.

== Description ==
(Description of A. a. ampyx) Upperside: Antennae white, brown at their extremities. Thorax, abdomen, and wings brown; the anterior wings having two oval straw-coloured spots placed near the middle, and the anterior edges of the posterior ones streaked with the same colour.

Underside: Palpi, breast, legs, and abdomen straw coloured. Wings straw coloured, being spotted and streaked with red brown, each of these markings appearing to have a gold spot or streak in its centre, forming a very beautiful and singular appearance. Margins of the anterior wings entire, but of the posterior ones a little dentated. Wingspan 1 3/4 inches (44 mm).

== Subspecies ==
- Anteros acheus acheus (Suriname)
- Anteros acheus ampyx (Drury, 1782) (Brazil: Rio de Janeiro)
- Anteros acheus troas Stichel, 1909 (Bolivia)
