= Royal Republic =

Swedish rock band

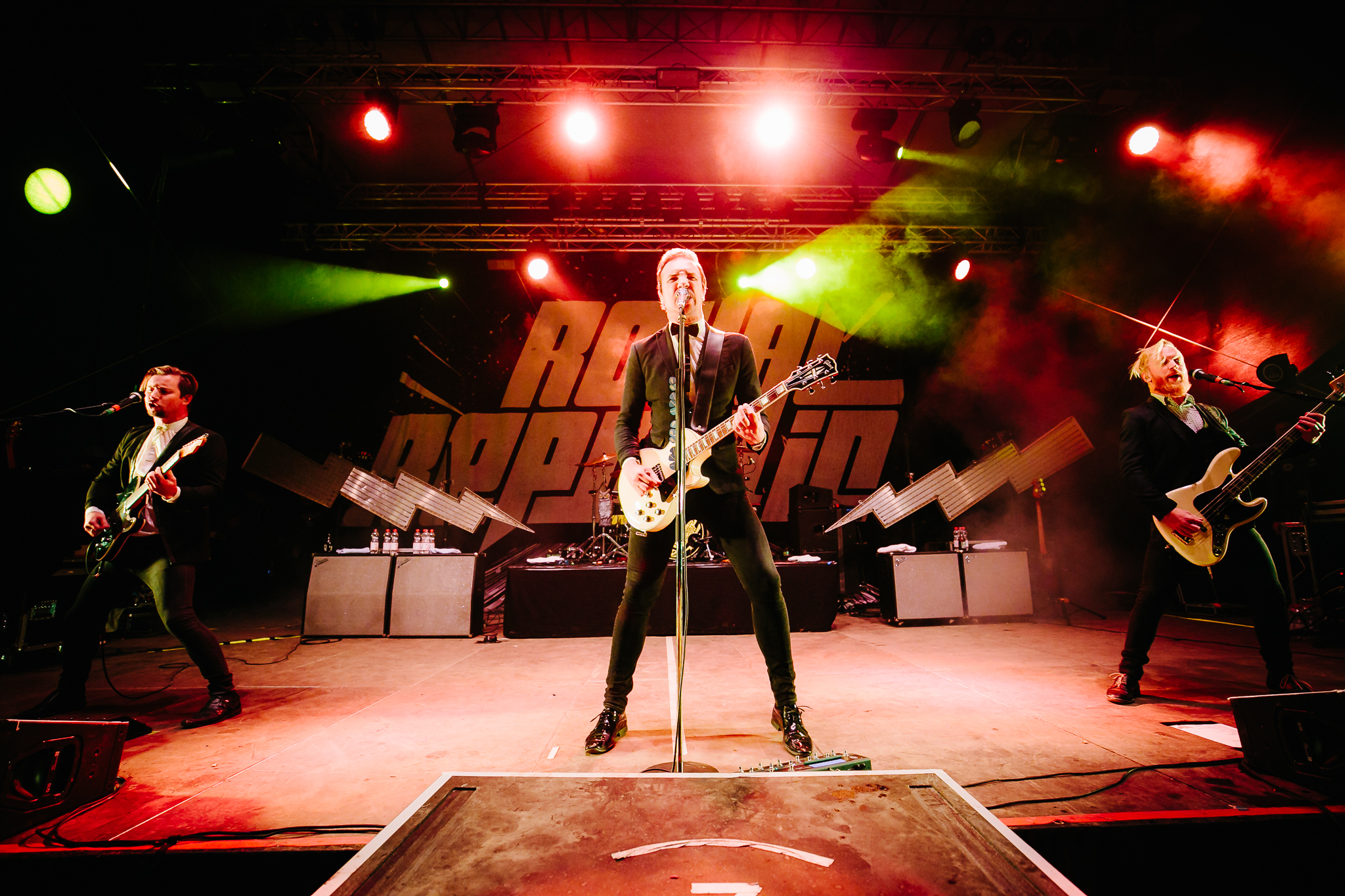
- Royal Republic performing in 2017

Background information
- Origin: Malmö, Sweden
- Genres: Garage rock, alternative rock, rock and roll, hard rock
- Years active: 2007–present
- Labels: Cosmos, Roadrunner, Warner Bros., Vertigo, Arising Empire
- Members: Adam Grahn; Hannes Irengård; Jonas Almén; Per Andreasson
- Website: royalrepublic.net

Royal Republic is a Swedish rock band from Malmö. The band is currently signed to Universal Music and managed by Odyssey Music Network.

== History ==
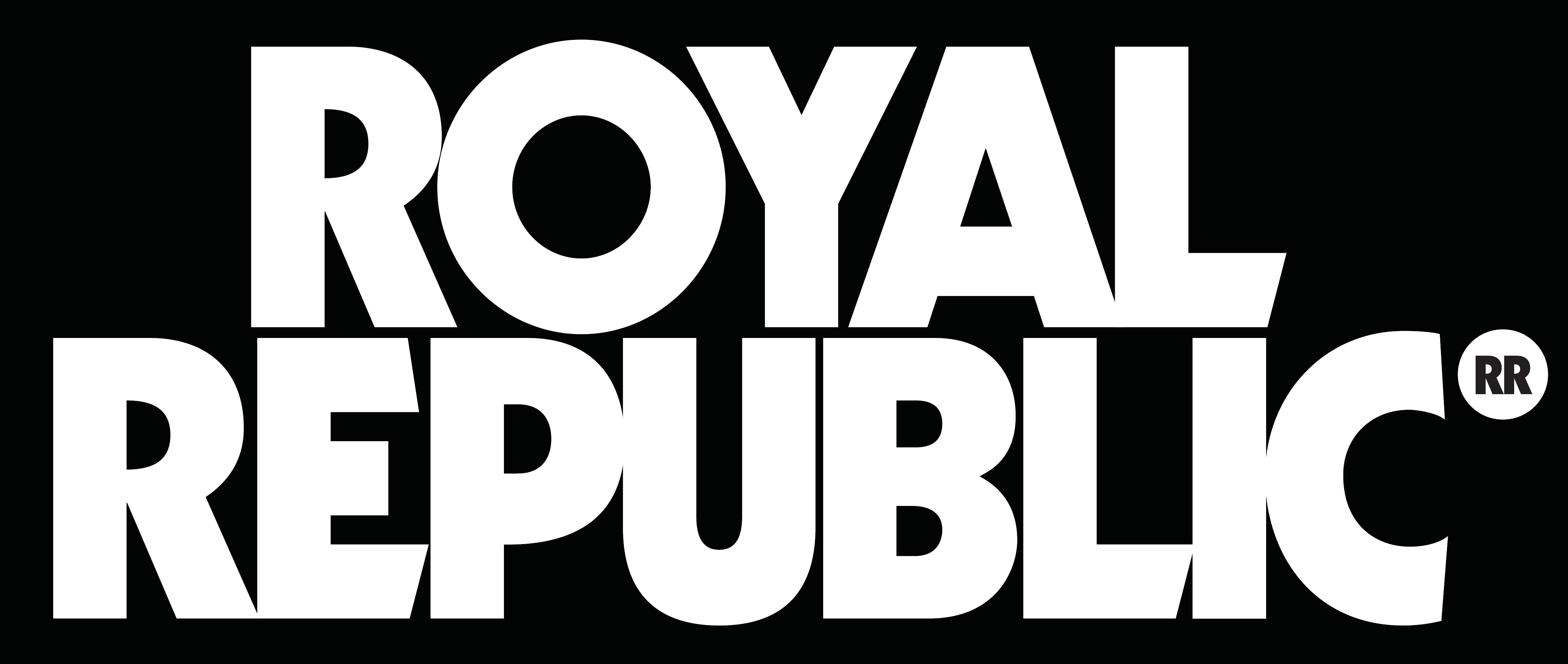
The band's logo

=== 2007–2012: Foundation and We Are the Royal ===
Royal Republic was founded in 2007. Their first album, We Are the Royal, was recorded under the supervision of Swedish producer Anders Hallbäck in Malmö. Hallbäck also plays bass on the single All Because Of You and even appears as the bassist in the music video. The album was mixed at ToyTown Studios and completed with the help of Stefan Glaumann. On 6 August 2009, the record was released in Sweden and received wide acclaim from critics, fans and radio stations.

All three singles reached number 1 on Bandit Rock's Most-Wanted-List. Three of the album's songs, Full Steam Spacemachine, I Must Be Out of My Mind, and 21st Century Gentleman, were featured on the soundtrack of F1 2011. Tommy-Gun also reached first place on the MTV Rocks charts. Royal Republic gained success in Germany through a collective tour with the Donots.

=== 2012–2014: Save the Nation ===
On 24 August 2012 the band released their second album titled Save the Nation. It was recorded by Michael Ilbert at Hansa Studio 1 and Hansa Mix Room. Tom Coyne mastered the record at Sterling Sound in New York City. Save the Nation was widely critically acclaimed and resulted in a better chart position than its predecessor We are the Royal. The release of the album was followed by concerts in Australia, Great Britain, Germany, France and the Benelux countries. Through the support of bands like Social Distortion, The Subways, Die Toten Hosen and blink-182 the band earned major recognition.

In addition, Royal Republic played in 2013 at the tradition-rich German festivals Rock am Ring and Rock im Park.

=== 2014–2016: Royal Republic and The Nosebreakers ===
In 2014 Royal Republic turned towards acoustic music. On 28 March the Swedes released Royal Republic and the Nosebreakers, on which songs from the previous albums We Are the Royal and Save the Nation were re-interpreted in an acoustic and country-like way. For the realization of the project, Adam Grahn, Hannes Irengard, Jonas Almén and Per Andreasson were assisted by studio musicians Daniel Olsson, Anders Svensson and Oskar Appelqvist. The latter even joined the band on the same tour.

All songs except This Means War were recorded at the Sunnana Studio by Markus Nilsson. They were largely mixed by Michael Illbert, who already mixed the previous record, at the Hansa Mix Room. This time the mastering was carried out at Chartmakers by Svante Forsbäck. The accompanying tour for this acoustic album consisted of ten dates, which led the band to Germany, France, Switzerland, Czech Republic, Austria, Poland, and Sweden.

=== 2016: Weekend Man ===
On 26 February 2016 Royal Republic released their fourth album, Weekend Man. Christian Neander and Michael Tibes were brought in as producers for this project. The latter was also responsible for the recordings that took place at Fuzzfactory in Berlin. Like their predecessors, Weekend Man was mixed by Michael Illbert at the Hansa Mix Room, and mastered by Tom Coyne of Sterling Sound.

=== 2019: Club Majesty ===
On 31 May 2019 Royal Republic released 'Club Majesty'. It was produced by largely the same team as Weekend Man; Christian Neander and Michael Tibes with the addition of Adam Grahn. Like its predecessor it was mainly recorded at FuzzFactory Berlin but also Vicious D. Licious Production Malmo. The album was taken out on the road commencing summer 2019 with the festival circuit (appearing on the main stage at Download) before a European cities tour in the autumn and winter.

=== 2024: LoveCop ===
On 9 February 2024 Royal Republic officially announced their sixth studio album LoveCop when they released the album's title track. The album was released worldwide on 7 June 2024. The band had previously alluded to the upcoming album at the end of their 5 January 2024 single My House. In May 2024, the band embarked on the Love Cop tour, performing in the following countries: Great Britain, Germany, Poland, France, Czech Rep., Croatia, Netherlands, Sweden, Austria, Hungary, Italy. During The tour they played at festivals such as Rockowizna in Poland, Rock Am Ring in Germany and Download Festival in Great Britain. The tour is planned to finish in 2026.

=== 2025: The Blastbeaters ===
In 2025, Royal Republic released a series of four cover songs/videos: "Venus", "I'm So Excited", "Stayin' Alive", and "Go West" while dressed as a fictional death-metal band The Blastbeaters trying to get their first gig. The Blastbeaters - EP was released on 13 Jun 2025.

== Band members ==
- Adam Grahn – lead vocals, rhythm guitar
- Hannes Irengård – lead guitar, backing vocals
- Jonas Almén – bass guitar, backing vocals, co-lead vocals on "I Don't Wanna Go Out"
- Per Andreasson – drums, backing vocals
- Anders Hallbäck - bass on 2 songs from We Are The Royal. Co-wrote, produced and appears as bassist in the video for All Because Of You.

== Discography ==
=== Studio albums ===
Title	Album details	Peak chart positions				Certifications
Title	Album details	AUT	GER	SWE	SWI	Certifications
We Are the Royal	Released: 25 January 2010; Label: Roadrunner; Formats: CD, LP, digital download	—	84	44	—	
Save the Nation	Released: 24 August 2012; Label: Odyssey Music Network; Formats: CD, LP, digital download	59	14	24	60	
Weekend Man	Released: 26 February 2016; Label: Capitol; Formats: CD, LP, digital download	45	15	—	93	
Club Majesty	Released: 31 May 2019; Label: Nuclear Blast; Formats: CD, LP, digital download	68	17	—	51	
LoveCop	Released: 7 June 2024; Label: Omn Label Services; Formats: CD, LP, digital download	—	11	—	60	

=== Singles ===
- "All Because of You" (2009)
- "Tommy-Gun" (2010)
- "Underwear" (2010)
- "Full Steam Spacemachine" (2010)
- "Addictive" (2012)
- "Everybody Wants to Be an Astronaut" (2012)
- "When I See You Dance With Another" (2015)
- "Baby" (2016) (#15 Mainstream Rock Songs)
- "Uh Huh" (2016)
- "Fireman & Dancer" (2019)
- "Boomerang" (2019)
- "Anna-Leigh" (2019)
- "Stop Movin'" (2019)
- "Superlove" (2020)
- "Magic" (2020)
- "RATA-TATA" (2021)
- "Back From The Dead" (2021)
- "Diggin' It" (2022)
- "Are You Gonna Go My Way (Live at l'0lympia) (2023)
- "RATA-TATA" (Live at l'0lympia) (2023)
- "My House" (2024)
- "LoveCop" (2024)
- "LazerLove" (2024)
- "Ain't Got Time" (2024)
- "Wow! Wow! Wow!" (2024)
- "Venus" (2025)
- "I'm So Excited" (2025)
- "Stayin' Alive" (2025)

=== Compilation CDs ===
Also available on several compilation CDs including:

- Bandit Rock #2 (2009) – disc 1, track 16
- Bandit Rock #3 (2010) – disc 1, track 8
- Sweden Rock #2 (2009) – disc 1, track 9
- Sweden Rock #3 (2010) – disc 1, track 3
