= Kastelholm Castle =

Medieval castle in Sund, Åland, Finland

- Sund, Åland, Finland
- View of the refurbished castle in 2017

Site information
- Owner: Government of Åland

Location
- Location within Finland
- Coordinates: 60°13′59″N 20°04′50″E

Site history
- Built: ~1300s

Kastelholm Castle (Swedish: Kastelholms slott, Finnish: Kastelholman linna) is a medieval castle built by the Swedes in the late 14th century. It is located near Road 2 in the municipality of Sund in Åland, Finland, about 25 kilometres (16 mi) northeast of Mariehamn, overlooking a fjord near the village of Kastelholm.

Kastelholm is one of five surviving medieval castles in Finland considered architecturally significant, along with Hämeenlinna, Olavinlinna, Raseborg, and Turku. Originally built on a small island surrounded by water-filled moats, it served both military and administrative functions. In the 15th and 16th centuries, it was an important stronghold held by nobles, feudal lords, and kings.

Damaged during the 1599 civil war and later gutted by fire in 1745, the castle fell into ruin but was partially restored in the 20th century. Since the 1990s, it has been a museum and a key cultural site in Åland.

== History ==
Construction of Kastelholm Castle began in the 1380s on its southern side. It was first mentioned in 1388 in a charter by Margaret I of Denmark, which transferred a large portion of the estate of Bo Jonsson Grip, the castle's first recorded occupant, to the queen. A 14th-century tax unit called rŏk was introduced to support the castle's maintenance.

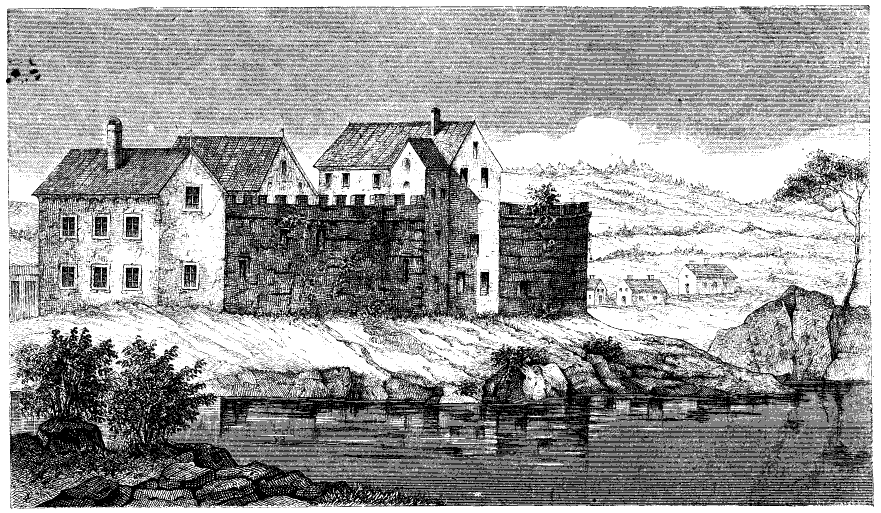
Kastelholm Castle in the 17th century

The castle reached its peak importance in the 15th and 16th centuries. In 1433, under the ownership of Lady Ida Königsmarck, it was besieged during the Engelbrecht rebellion. In 1485, Niels Eriksen Gyldenstjerne, then Danish Steward of the Realm, received the castle as a fief with a royal directive to repair and improve its structures for the benefit of the Swedish crown.

Significant expansions were made by Gustav Vasa before his reign, who frequently hunted in the surrounding forests. These lands were protected by law, reserved exclusively for the king and the castle's governor.

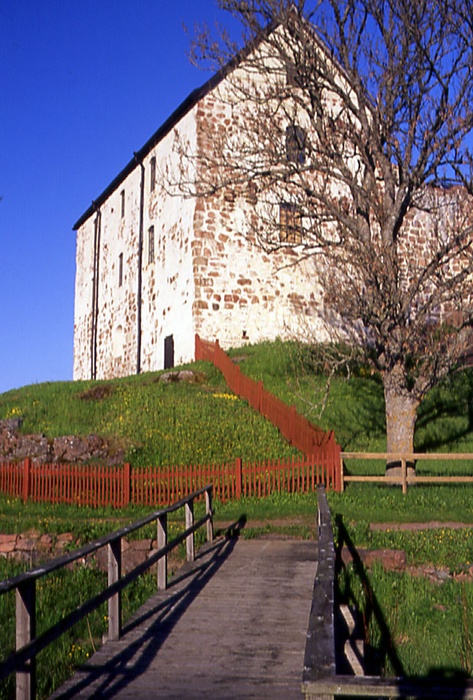
Kastelholm Castle in 2004

In the 16th century, Kastelholm developed a shipyard that employed around 50 shipwrights. In 1505, the castle was captured by the Danish naval commander Søren Norby. The first documented presence of Roma in Finland appears in the castle’s records from 1559.

In 1571, John III of Sweden imprisoned his deposed brother, Eric XIV, in the castle. At the time (1568–1621), the castle was held by Queen Dowager Catherine Stenbock, a political rival of Eric. The castle sustained heavy damage during the 1599 civil war, when forces loyal to Charles IX of Sweden captured it using artillery, amid the War against Sigismund.

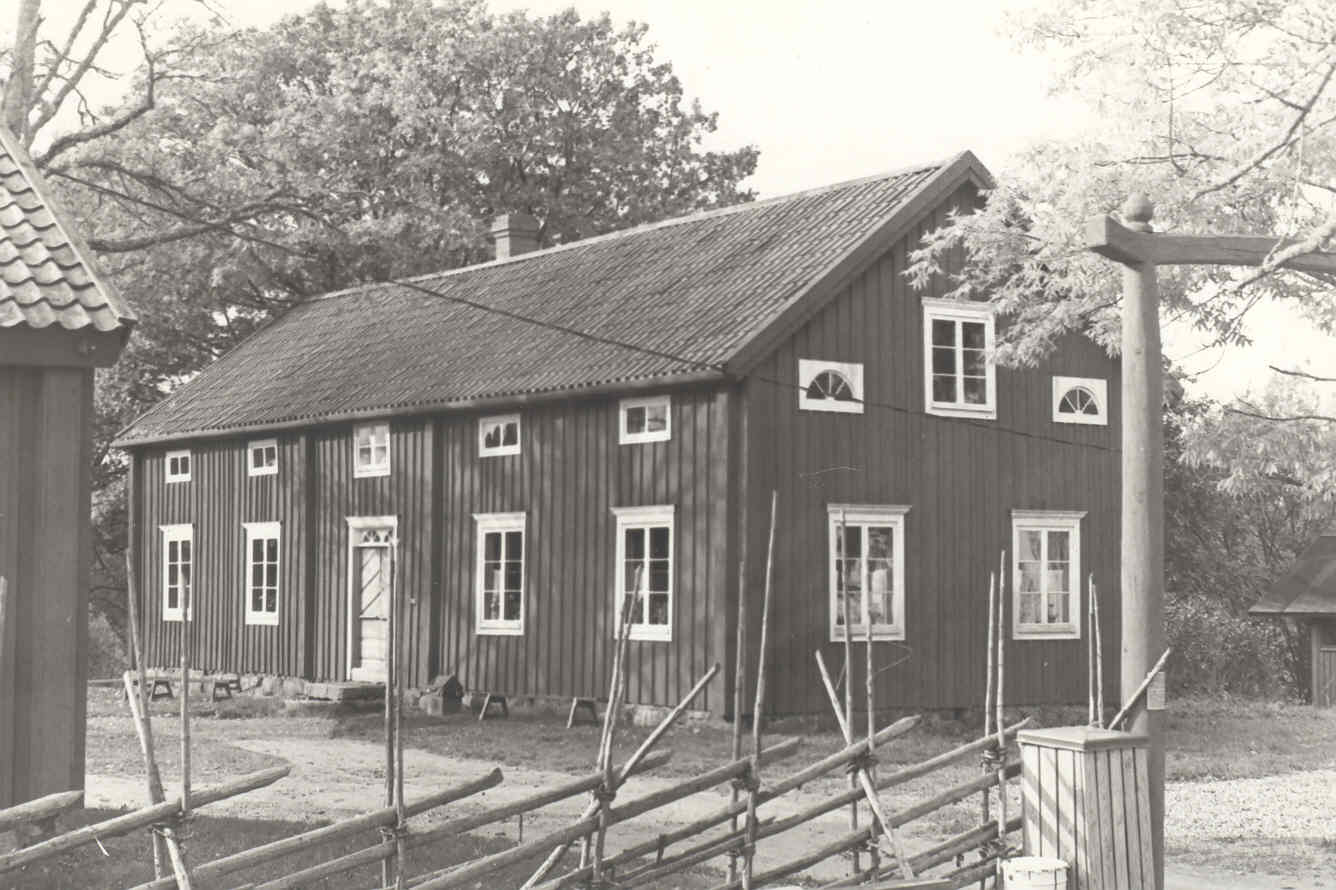
Outdoor Museum Jan Karlsgården

Repairs were completed by 1631, but the administrative role of Kastelholm declined after Åland was integrated into the Åbo and Björneborg County. The castle's importance faded, and it later hosted the Kastelholm witch trials in the 1660s. After decades of neglect, much of the structure was destroyed in a fire in 1745. It briefly served as a prison before being abandoned in the 1770s. By the early 19th century, administrative functions such as the post office and Russian commandant’s secretariat had moved to Bomarsund.

In the 1930s, Kastelholm was used as a granary and even a quarry by local farmers. A restoration program, including archaeological excavations, took place between 1982 and 1989. Today, the castle is partially restored and houses the Outdoor Museum Jan Karlsgården.

== Architecture ==
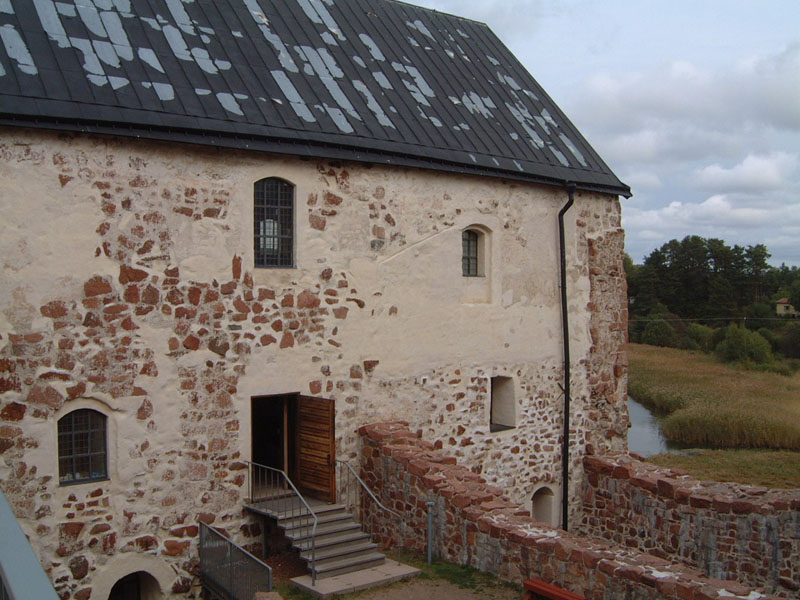
One of the castle entrances

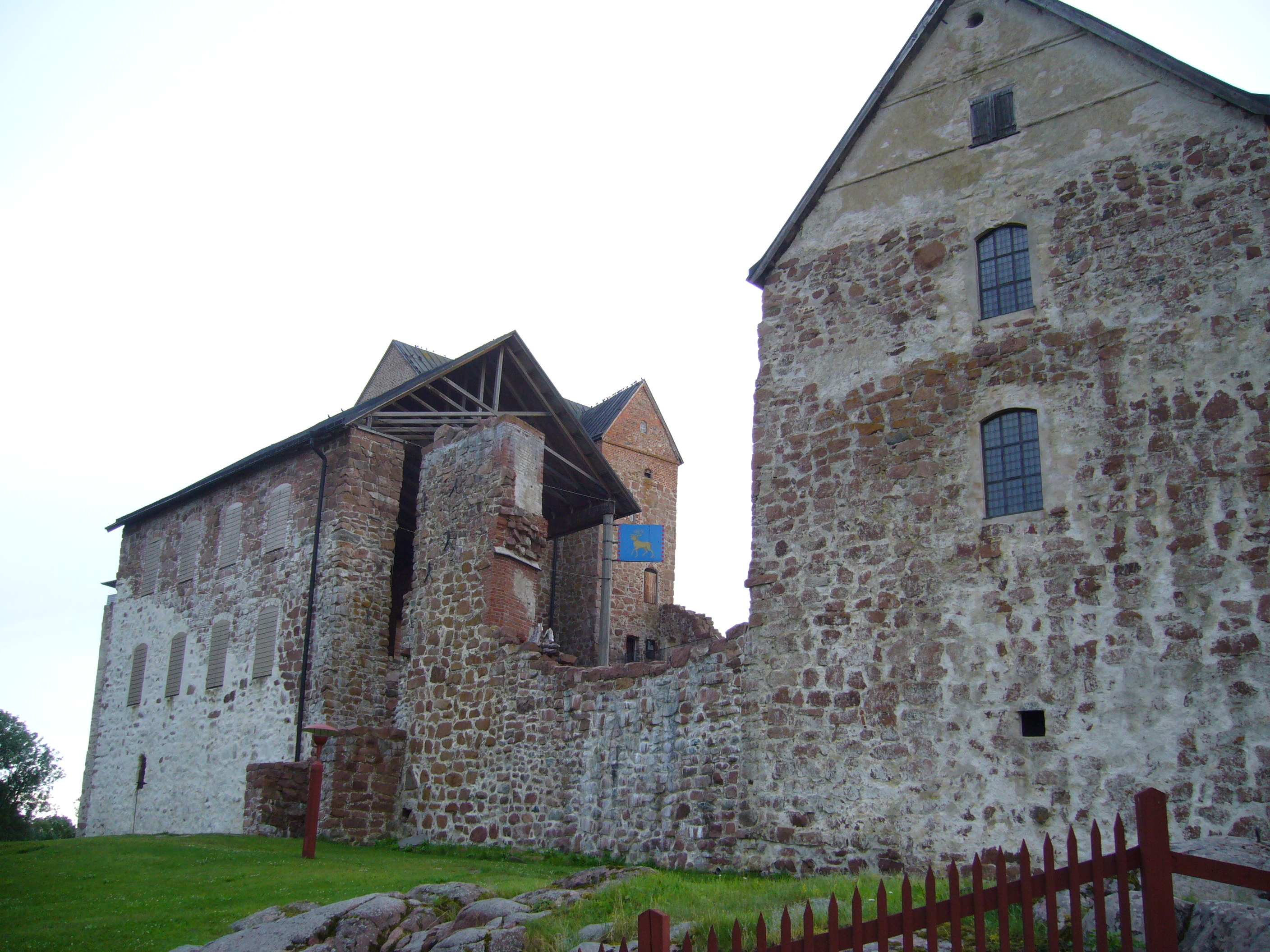
Exterior view of the wall

Views of Kastelholm Castle

Kastelholm Castle was built on a small island to reinforce Swedish control over Åland. The island was naturally surrounded by water and further protected by moats lined with poles. A defensive wall, about 3-metre (9.8 ft), encircles the main structure.

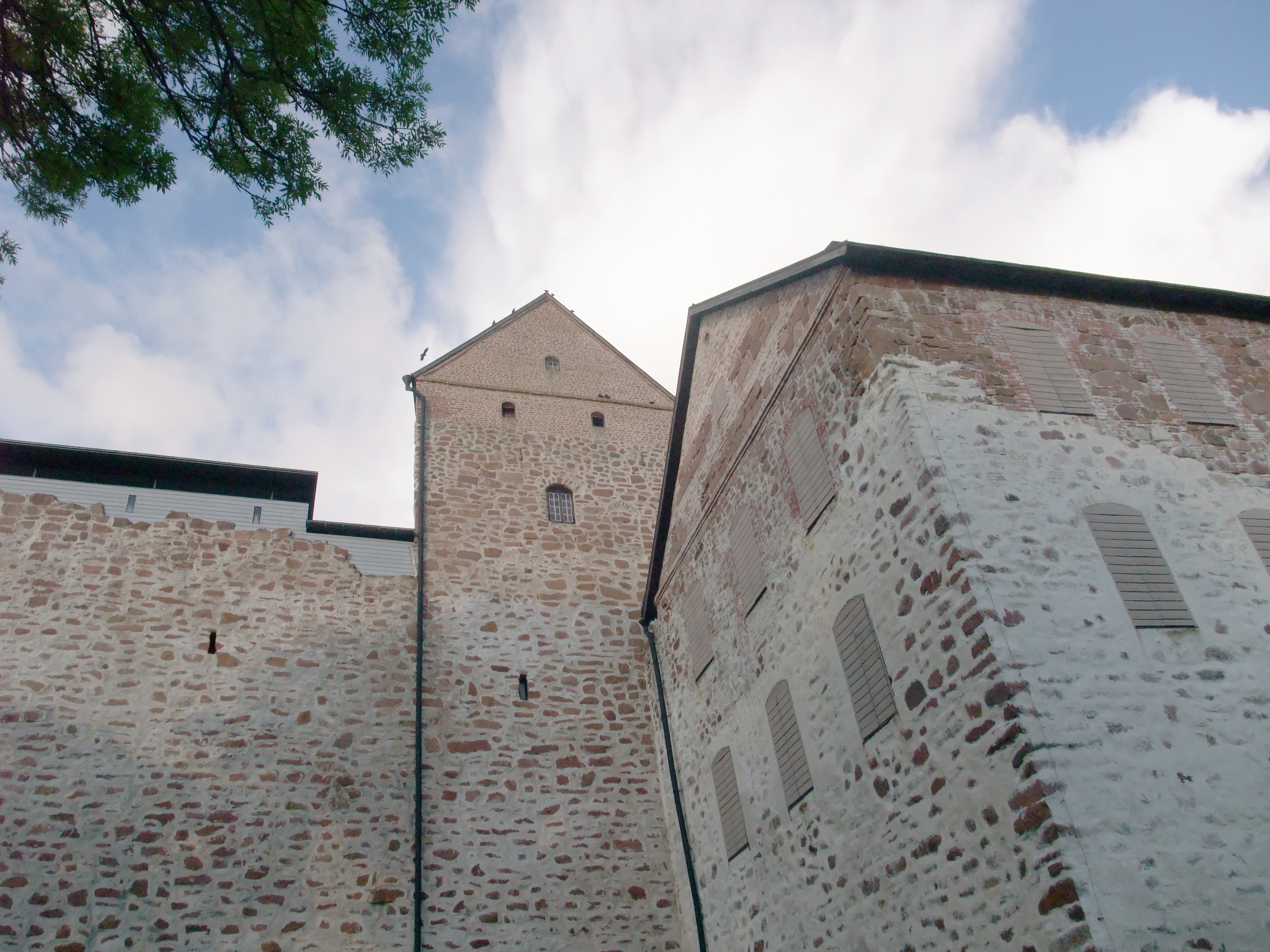
Interior structure of the castle

The castle was constructed using brick and mortar. Its original layout featured a rectangular stone keep and a residential wing. Two gate towers were added: one between the main castle and the outer bailey in the 15th century, and another between the outer bailey and the exterior perimeter in the 16th century. These towers were later merged into a single large donjon, known as Kurtornet.

A later-built hall was eventually repurposed as a granary. The castle also includes a chapel, with Berard of Carbio and four other Moroccan martyrs as its patron saints.

== Tourism ==
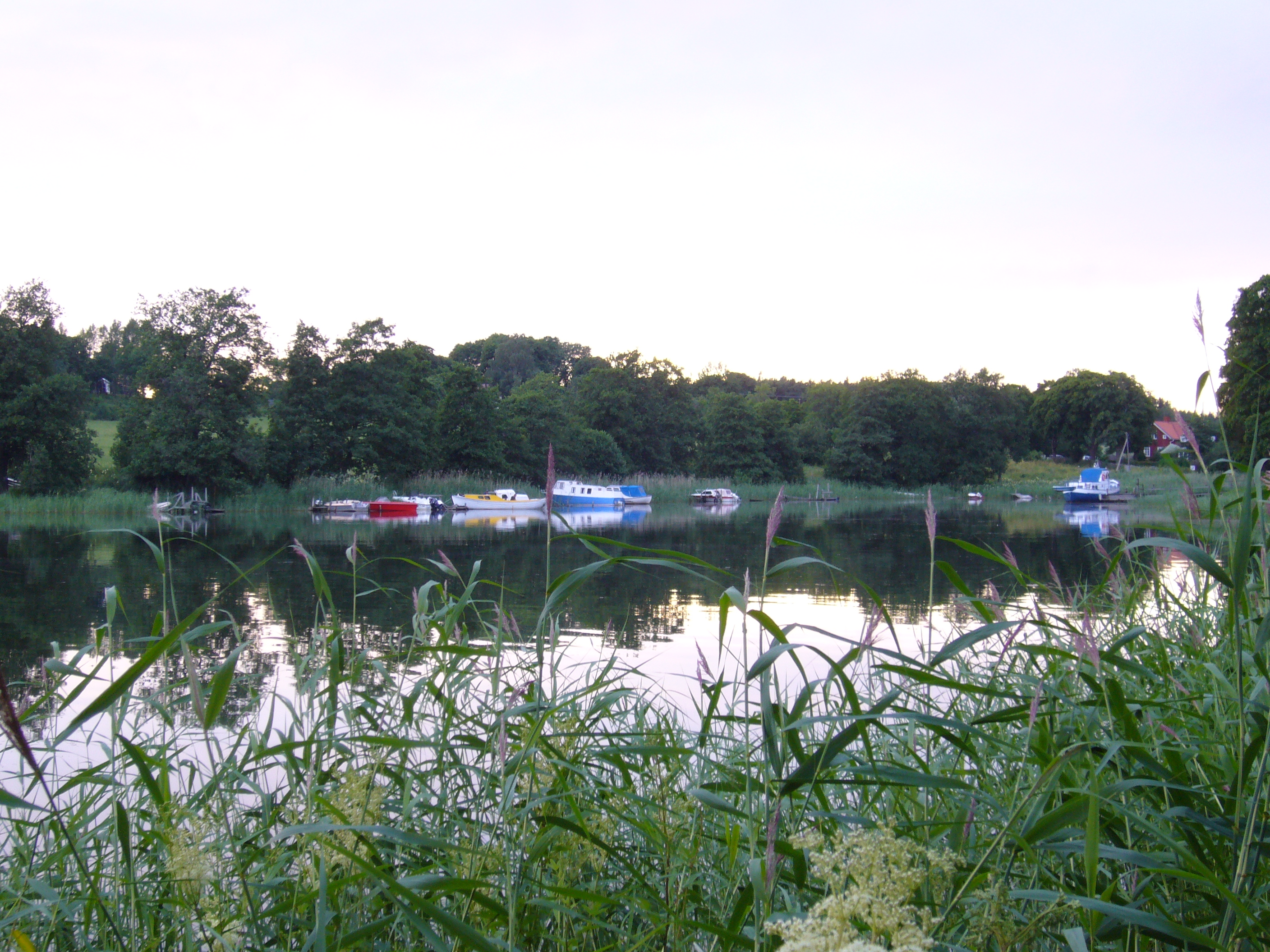
Boats on the fjord of Kastelholm

The castle is a major tourist attraction easily accessible by car from Mariehamn and by bus only on weekdays. Excavated items, such as early stove tiles, are on exhibit in the hall. A medieval festival, replete with dance, food, and jousting occurs each year in July. The area around and down to Stornäset has become a royal estate with a golf course also available in the area.

Other attractions nearby include the Outdoor Museum Jan Karlsgården, which is next to the castle, and the nearby ruins of Bomarsund, a huge Russian-built naval fortress. The fjord on which the castle is located on is used for sailing and for boating.

== Blasting controversy ==
Blasting plans to build a new road some 700 metres (2,300 ft) from Kastelholm caused considerable controversy and dispute. The castle authorities and the media were under the impression that the vibrations from the blasting would create irreplaceable damage to the foundations of this ancient landmark and given that the castle had been recently renovated internally at the time believed it would cause damage. In the end, experts assessed that the way the vibrations would be distributed would not cause the damage that was anticipated and the blasting went ahead.
