= Eurovision Song Contest: The Story of Fire Saga =

2020 American musical comedy film

- Promotional film poster
- Directed by: David Dobkin
- Written by: Will Ferrell; Harper Steele (Note: Credited as Andrew Steele; Steele came out as transgender and changed her name in 2022.)
- Produced by: Will Ferrell; Jessica Elbaum; Chris Henchy
- Starring: Will Ferrell; Rachel McAdams; Dan Stevens; Melissanthi Mahut; Mikael Persbrandt; Ólafur Darri Ólafsson; Graham Norton; Demi Lovato; Pierce Brosnan; Elín Petersdóttir
- Cinematography: Danny Cohen
- Edited by: Greg Hayden
- Music by: Atli Örvarsson
- Production companies: Gary Sanchez Productions; Gloria Sanchez Productions; European Broadcasting Union
- Distributed by: Netflix
- Release date: June 26, 2020
- Running time: 123 minutes
- Country: United States
- Language: English
- Budget: $35 million

Eurovision Song Contest: The Story of Fire Saga is a 2020 American musical romantic comedy film directed by David Dobkin, written by Will Ferrell and Harper Steele, and starring Ferrell, Rachel McAdams, Dan Stevens, Melissanthi Mahut, Mikael Persbrandt, Ólafur Darri Ólafsson, Graham Norton, Demi Lovato, Pierce Brosnan, and Elín Petersdóttir. It follows the personally close Icelandic singers Lars Erickssong (Ferrell) and Sigrit Ericksdóttir (McAdams) as they are given the chance to represent their country in the Eurovision Song Contest.

Development of a film based on the Eurovision Song Contest began in 2018, with Ferrell, a self-described follower of the event, attending the 2018 and 2019 editions to conceive the characters and story. The film was officially announced in June 2018, and filming took place between August and October 2019 in Scotland, Iceland, and England.

The Story of Fire Saga was originally scheduled for a May 2020 release on Netflix to coincide with the Eurovision Song Contest 2020. Due to the COVID-19 pandemic, the 2020 contest was canceled, and the film was subsequently released a month later, on June 26. It received mixed reviews from critics, who praised the original music but criticised the screenplay and runtime. The film received a nomination for Best Original Song at the 93rd Academy Awards (for "Husavik").

== Plot ==
In the Icelandic small town of Húsavík, longtime friends Lars Erickssong and Sigrit Ericksdóttir make music together as the band Fire Saga, with Lars dreaming of winning the Eurovision Song Contest. At the local bar where they regularly perform, the only song the audience wants to hear is the suggestive nonsense song "Jaja Ding Dong". Lars' widowed father Erick and Sigrit's mother Helga disapprove of their partnership, with Helga saying that Lars is holding Sigrit back and that she will never hit the "Speorg note"—a note that can only be sung when being your truest self—when singing with him. The pair apply and are selected to take part in Söngvakeppnin, the Icelandic preselection for Eurovision. Sigrit, who believes in the old Icelandic tradition of elves (although Lars doesn't), asks the elves for help to get them into the contest in the hope that if they win, Lars will return Sigrit's feelings for him.

Fire Saga's performance at Söngvakeppnin goes wrong due to technical problems. A dejected Lars declines to attend the boat party thrown for all the finalists and sits on the dock as Sigrit tries to console him. The boat suddenly explodes, killing everyone on board and leaving Fire Saga as the only surviving contestants and thus winners by default. Lars and Sigrit arrive in Edinburgh, Scotland, where Eurovision is being held. Once there, they struggle with a new remix of their song and Lars' elaborate staging plans. Alexander Lemtov, the Russian representative and a favourite to win the contest, invites Lars and Sigrit to a party at his house. He introduces them to other contestants, including the Greek entrant Mita Xenakis. Lemtov and Sigrit spend the night together, as do Lars and Mita, although neither pair becomes intimate. At their rehearsal, Sigrit expresses her disdain for the new clothing and remix and asks Lars to revert the changes. Back at the hotel, Lars overhears Sigrit working on a new song and presumes that it is a love song for Lemtov.

Fire Saga's semi-final performance initially runs well, but is botched by an accident involving Sigrit's scarf getting caught in a hamster wheel prop, which rolls off the stage and into the audience. The two recover and finish the song, but are met with deafening silence and scattered laughter. Believing that they have become a laughingstock, they exit the stage, unaware that the crowd has applauded them for their persistence in finishing the performance, and that they have qualified for the final. As Lars prepares to return to Iceland, Sigrit pleads with Lars to stay but fails, prompting her to break up with him, while also revealing that she wrote the love song for Lars.

Out at sea, Lars confesses his love for Sigrit to Erick, before leaving for Edinburgh upon learning that Iceland is in the final. He hitches a ride with Victor Karlosson, governor of the Central Bank of Iceland and one of the Icelandic organisational team members, who attempts to kill Lars. Victor reveals that he blew up the boat at Söngvakeppnin for fear that if Iceland wins Eurovision, they would have to host the following year's contest which could lead to the country's bankruptcy. Unseen elves save Lars by killing Victor with a thrown knife in the back, allowing Lars to return to Edinburgh and proving to him that elves do exist. Arriving at Edinburgh, he finds that all the taxi drivers are at home watching the contest, so he persuades four American tourists in a rental car to drive him to the venue. Interrupting the performance, he encourages Sigrit to ditch their entry and perform the song she has written for him, "Husavik". Lars plays the song on the piano with Sigrit singing, culminating with a Speorg note, before they share a kiss onstage to a standing ovation. Backstage, Lemtov is happy for the two and accepts Mita's invitation to move to Greece with her.

Fire Saga is disqualified for changing their song during the contest, but both Lars and Sigrit realise that their relationship is more important than winning the competition. Lars and Sigrit return to Húsavík, where they are met by a cheering crowd of townsfolk. Some time later, Lars and Sigrit marry and have a baby. They return to performing in the local bar, this time at Erick and Helga's wedding reception. They ask if anyone wants to hear their Eurovision song, but the crowd, now including the four American tourists, once again demands "Jaja Ding Dong".

== Cast ==
- Will Ferrell as Lars Erickssong, a middle-aged man with aspirations of winning the Eurovision Song Contest
  - Alfie Melia as young Lars
- Rachel McAdams as Sigrit Ericksdóttir, Lars' bandmate and long-time best friend, who wishes for a romantic relationship with him
  - Sophia-Grace Donnelly as young Sigrit
  - Molly Sandén sings parts of Sigrit's songs (she and McAdams worked together to produce Sigrit's singing voice).
- Dan Stevens as Alexander Lemtov, a flamboyant singer representing Russia
  - Erik Mjönes sings all Lemtov's songs
- Melissanthi Mahut as Mita Xenakis, another contestant, representing Greece
  - Petra Nielsen sings Mita's song.
- Mikael Persbrandt as Victor Karlosson, governor of the Central Bank of Iceland, who does not want Iceland to win the contest
- Ólafur Darri Ólafsson as Neils Brongus, president of RÚV, Iceland's national public service broadcaster
- Graham Norton as himself, a Eurovision commentator, credited as playing Graham Norton
- Demi Lovato as Katiana Lindsdóttir, winner of Söngvakeppnin
- Pierce Brosnan as Erick Erickssong, Lars' disapproving widowed father who is implied to be Sigrit's father as well
- Joi Johannsson as Jorn, a member of the Icelandic Eurovision committee
- Alfrun Rose as Anna, a member of the Icelandic Eurovision committee
- Björn Hlynur Haraldsson as Arnar, a policeman who has a crush on Sigrit
- Jamie Demetriou as Kevin Swain, head of Iceland's creative team
- Jon Kortajarena as Corin Vladvitch, the Eurovision host
- Elina Alminas as Sasha More, the Eurovision host
- Elín Petersdóttir as Helga, Sigrit's mother
- Christopher Jeffers as Johnny John John, a rapper representing Sweden
- Rebecca Harrod as Brittny, one of the American tourists
- Josh Zaré as Bill, one of the American tourists
- Bobby Lockwood as Jeff, one of the American tourists
- Eleanor Williams as Jenn, one of the American tourists
- Jóhannes Haukur Jóhannesson as Johans, male host of Söngvakeppnin
- Natasia Demetriou as Nina, a crew member at the contest
- Hannes Óli Ágústsson as Olaf Yohansson, a resident of Húsavík, who is obsessed with "Jaja Ding Dong"
- Milan van Weelden as 21st Century Viking.
- William Lee Adams as himself, a Eurovision commentator.
- Zack Propert as Stephan, Fire Saga's drummer

=== Appearances of Eurovision artists ===
Several participants of the Eurovision Song Contest made cameo appearances in the film:

- John Lundvik – represented Sweden in 2019
- Anna Odobescu – represented Moldova in 2019
- Bilal Hassani – represented France in 2019
- Loreen – won for Sweden in 2012 and 2023 (Note: Subsequent to the release of the film)
- Jessy Matador – represented France in 2010
- Alexander Rybak – won for Norway in 2009 and represented Norway in 2018
- Jamala – won for Ukraine in 2016
- Elina Nechayeva – represented Estonia in 2018
- Conchita Wurst – won for Austria in 2014
- Netta – won for Israel in 2018

Other appearances include:

- Salvador Sobral (won for Portugal in 2017) as a busker playing piano in Scotland
- Molly Sandén (represented Sweden in 2006 at Junior Eurovision) who dubs Rachel McAdams in all of Sigrit's songs.
- Petra Nielsen (Melodifestivalen 2004 contestant) who dubs Melissanthi Mahut in Mita Xenakis' song.

== Production ==
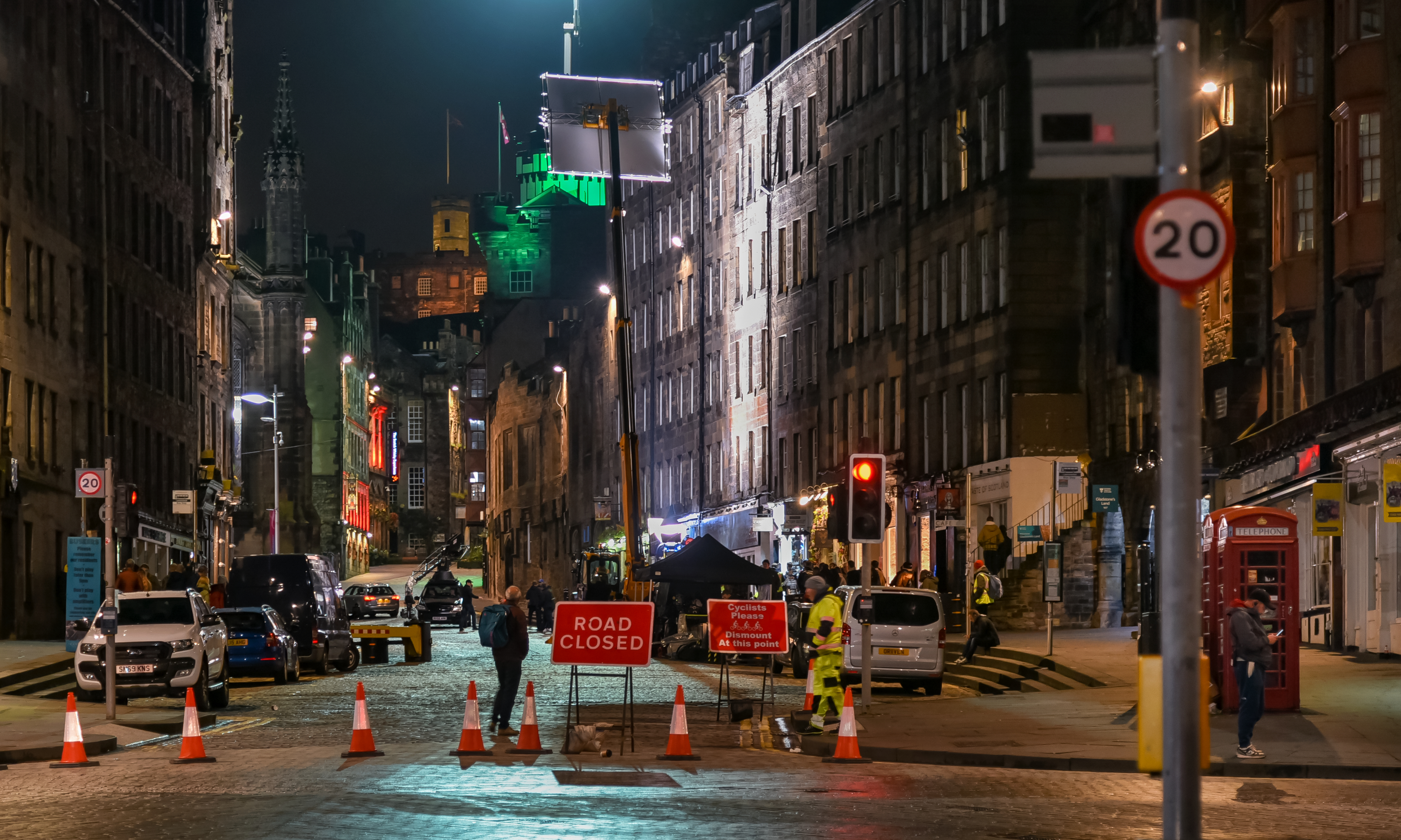
Filming in Edinburgh

Ferrell was introduced to the Eurovision Song Contest in 1998 by his Swedish wife, actress Viveca Paulin. The song "Take Me to Your Heaven" by Charlotte Perrelli, was cited as the reason he became invested in the competition.

In May 2018, in preparation for the film, Ferrell attended the final of the Eurovision Song Contest 2018 with the Icelandic delegation at the Altice Arena in Lisbon, Portugal, to research possible characters and scenarios for the film. He also spoke backstage with Eurovision contestants. On June 18, 2018, it was announced that Ferrell would star, co-write and produce a film inspired by the Eurovision Song Contest. The film would be distributed by Netflix.

In March 2019, David Dobkin signed on to direct the film. In May 2019, Rachel McAdams joined the cast. McAdams and Ferrell were spotted by another delegation during the dress rehearsals for the Eurovision Song Contest 2019 held in Tel Aviv, Israel, the stage of which was later rebuilt on a soundstage in London for the in-contest scenes, while plate shots were done with the real-life live audience back in Tel Aviv. In August 2019, Pierce Brosnan, Dan Stevens, and Demi Lovato joined the cast, with filming commencing in Edinburgh and Glasgow, and in Iceland. Ferrell was pictured filming scenes at both the OVO Hydro, in Glasgow itself, and Glasgow Airport, in Abbotsinch, Paisley, in October 2019. Filming also took place at Warner Bros. Studios, Leavesden making it the second Netflix film to be filmed there, after Mowgli: Legend of the Jungle. Knebworth House was used for the exterior shots of Alexander Lemtov's British house in the film.

The actors studied Icelandic and did specific work with a speech therapist to be able to speak English with the country's accent without any kind of cliché. They also trained with Icelandic coaches and McAdams studied Björk mannerisms and physical behaviors. Tabitha and Napoleon D'umo (known for So You Think You Can Dance) oversaw the choreography.

Production costs in Iceland were stipulated as a value of US$3.6 million. The Icelandic government contributed around US$1 million to that sum as part of an incentive package for the local film industry and as a way to attract tourists. The European Broadcasting Union (EBU) also invested an undisclosed financial amount in the project.

== Soundtrack ==
Eurovision Song Contest: The Story of Fire Saga (Music from the Netflix Film)

Soundtrack album by various artists
- Released: June 26, 2020
- Length: 42:28
- Labels: Arista; Sony Music Entertainment
- Producer: Savan Kotecha

Singles from Eurovision Song Contest: The Story of Fire Saga (Music from the Netflix Film)
- 1. "Volcano Man" Released: May 15, 2020

The soundtrack album for the film was released digitally on June 26, 2020, and the CD release followed on August 21, 2020. "Volcano Man" was the first song released from the album and features vocals from Will Ferrell and Swedish singer Molly Sandén (credited as My Marianne). According to Netflix, Sandén's vocals were mixed with McAdams' own voice for the tracks. In a separate phone call with Vanity Fair, the soundtrack's producer, Savan Kotecha, said that Sandén and McAdams' "tones worked so well together" that, in playing back certain tracks, he had a hard time differentiating between the vocals. The soundtrack was nominated for a Grammy Award for Best Compilation Soundtrack for Visual Media at the 63rd Annual Grammy Awards.

=== Track listing ===
Eurovision Song Contest: The Story of Fire Saga (Music from the Netflix Film) track listing
No.	Title	Writer(s)	Producer(s)	Length
1.	"Double Trouble (Tiësto's Euro 90s Tribute Remix)" (performed by Will Ferrell, My Marianne, and Tiësto)	Arnthor Birgisson; Rami Yacoub; Savan Kotecha	Birgisson; Rami	2:28
2.	"Lion of Love" (performed by Erik Mjönes)	Yacoub; Kotecha; Johan Carlsson	Kotecha	2:47
3.	"Coolin' with Da Homies" (performed by Savan Kotecha)	Kotecha; Yacoub	Rami	1:26
4.	"Volcano Man" (performed by Ferrell and Marianne)	Gustaf Holter; Christian Persson	Holter; Persson	1:21
5.	"Jaja Ding Dong" (performed by Ferrell and Marianne)	Holter; Persson	Holter; Persson	1:37
6.	"In the Mirror" (performed by Demi Lovato)	Jörgen Elofsson	Elofsson; Anton "Hybrid" Mårtensson	2:48
7.	"Happy" (performed by Ferrell and Marianne)	Pharrell Williams	Kotecha; Nevin Sastry	1:26
8.	"Song-a-Long: "Believe", "Ray of Light", "Waterloo", "Ne partez pas sans moi", and "I Gotta Feeling"" (performed by cast)	Brian Higgins; Stuart McLennen; Paul Barry; Steven Torch; Matthew Gray; Timothy Powell; Madonna; William Orbit; Clive Maldoon; Dave Curtiss; Christine Leach; Benny Andersson; Björn Ulvaeus; Stig Anderson; Nella Martinetti; Atilla Şereftuğ; William Adams; Stacy Ferguson; Jaime Gomez; David Guetta; Allan Pineda; Frédéric Riesterer	Alana da Fonseca	3:18
9.	"Running with the Wolves" (performed by Courtney Jenaé and Adam Grahn)	Andreas Carlsson; Andreas Öberg; Christoffer Lauridsen	A. Carlsson; Öberg; Lauridsen	1:10
10.	"Fool Moon" (performed by Anteros)	Jake Gosling; Laura Hayden; Sam Monaghan	Charlie Andrew	3:26
11.	"Hit My Itch" (performed by Antonio Sol, David Loucks, Taylor Lindersmith, and Nicole Leontih)	Chris Wagner; Danny Pinnella; Ric Markmann	Gosling; Hayden; Monaghan; Rumble	2:04
12.	"Come and Play (Masquerade)" (performed by Petra Nielsen)	Thomas G:son	G:son	3:08
13.	"Amar pelos dois" (performed by Salvador Sobral)	Luísa Sobral	L. Sobral	3:05
14.	"Husavik (My Hometown)" (performed by Ferrell and Marianne)	Fat Max Gsus; Rickard Göransson; Kotecha	Fat Max Gsus	3:22
15.	"Double Trouble (Film Version)" (performed by Ferrell and Marianne)	Birgisson; Yacoub; Kotecha	Birgisson; Rami	2:54
16.	"Eurovision Suite" (performed by Atli Örvarsson)	Örvarsson	Örvarsson	6:19

=== Charts ===
Chart (2020)	Peak position
Australian Albums (ARIA)	44
Belgian Albums (Ultratop Flanders)	64
Icelandic Albums (Tónlistinn)	2
Norwegian Albums (VG-lista)	13
Swedish Albums (Sverigetopplistan)	8
UK Soundtrack Albums (Official Charts)	1
US Billboard 200	170
US Soundtrack Albums (Billboard)	5

== Release ==
The Story of Fire Saga was digitally released by Netflix on June 26, 2020. In its first weekend, the film was the top-streamed item on Netflix in the United States and reached the No. 1 ranking position in multiple other regions as well. In its second weekend it fell to number eight on the site.

After the cancellation of the Eurovision Song Contest 2020, as part of broadcasting plans for the following year's contest, the movie was aired by several broadcasters competing that year, typically on public channels affiliated with the European Broadcasting Union, the producers of both the contest and the film.

Country	Network(s)	Date(s)	Ref.
Australia	SBS	14 May 2021	
Australia	SBS World Movies	29 May 2021	
Belgium	Eén	15 May 2021	
Croatia	HRT 2	19 May 2021	
Denmark	DR1	21 May 2021	
Denmark	DR1	23 May 2021	
Greece	Open TV (undubbed)	15 July 2022	
Estonia	ETV+	21 May 2021	
Ireland	RTÉ One	19 May 2021	
Latvia	LTV1	14 May 2021	
Lithuania	LRT televizija	22 May 2021	
Malta	TVM	15 May 2021	
Norway	NRK1	17 May 2021	
Norway	NRK3	21 May 2021	
Portugal	RTP1	22 May 2021	
San Marino	San Marino RTV (undubbed)	16 May 2021	
Spain	La 1	22 May 2021	
Sweden	SVT2	15 May 2021	
Switzerland	SRF zwei	19 May 2021	

== Reception ==
On Rotten Tomatoes, the film holds an approval rating of 63% based on 183 reviews, with an average rating of 5.8/10. The site's critics consensus reads: "Eurovision Song Contest: The Story of Fire Saga contains inspired ingredients and laugh-out-loud moments but they're outnumbered by the flat stretches in this overlong comedy." On Metacritic, the film has a weighted average score of 50 out of 100, based on 39 critics, indicating "mixed or average" reviews.

David Rooney of The Hollywood Reporter wrote: "If ever a comedy cried out for tight 85-minute treatment that keeps the gags pinging fast enough to disguise the thin sketch material at its core, it's this hit-or-miss two-hour feature." Owen Gleiberman of Variety called it "a badly shot one-joke movie that sits there and goes thud." Chris Hewitt of Empire magazine wrote: "The votes are in and it's official: this largely unfunny paean to Eurovision is a waste of some serious talent. At least some of the songs are decent." Hewitt also complained about the length of the film: "It's all rather airless and lifeless and is at least half an hour too long." Robbie Collin of The Daily Telegraph wrote: "Sending up the Eurovision Song Contest is like flattening Salisbury Plain: one quick look at the thing should be enough to reassure you that the job took care of itself long ago. Nevertheless, Will Ferrell has decided to give it a shot and the result is this pulverisingly unfunny and vacuous two-hour gauntlet run of non-entertainment." Peter Bradshaw of The Guardian wrote: "The movie is not a disaster, just weirdly pointless". Bradshaw also criticizes the script saying it "pulls its punches" and the plot is borrowed from The Producers. Other writers noted plot similarities with the 1996 Father Ted episode "A Song for Europe".

Charlotte O'Sullivan of the Evening Standard gave the film a more positive review, praising the performances of McAdams and Stevens and writing that "Ferrell, who co-wrote the script, wisely realises that this institution is beyond parody and is simply content to pay homage. The result is extremely silly and ridiculously rousing." David Sims of The Atlantic praised the film's "chipper spirit" and wrote "this is a comedy that knows how to make fun and have fun." Kevin Maher of The Times concluded that "This might just be the most idiotic movie of the year so far. But joyously so."

Icelandic tour company Reykjavik Excursions stated on its blog that two days after the film's release, "everyone had seen the film. And for the most part, they loved it". The company praised the film's accuracy, such as the concerns that the country could not afford to host Eurovision in the event of a victory, Ferrell and McAdams's "Euro-hippie appearance with the woolen sweaters and raggedy hair", and the depiction of Húsavík and the elves.

== Accolades ==
Award	Date	Category	Recipient	Result
Academy Awards	April 25, 2021	Best Original Song	Savan Kotecha, Fat Max Gsus and Rickard Göransson for "Husavik"	Nominated
Critics' Choice Movie Awards	March 7, 2021	Best Song	Savan Kotecha, Rickard Göransson & Fat Max Gsus for "Husavik"	Nominated
Grammy Awards	March 14, 2021	Best Compilation Soundtrack for Visual Media	Eurovision Song Contest: The Story of Fire Saga	Nominated
Hollywood Music in Media Awards	January 27, 2021	Best Original Song in a Feature Film	Savan Kotecha, Rickard Göransson, Fat Max Gsus, Will Ferrell, Rachel McAdams, Molly Sandén for "Husavik"	Nominated
Hugo Award	April 13, 2021	Best Dramatic Presentation, Long Form	Will Ferrell, Harper Steele, David Dobkin	Nominated
Motion Picture Sound Editors Awards	April 16, 2021	Outstanding Achievement in Sound Editing – Musical for Feature Film	Allegra De Souza, Peter Oso Snell, Jon Mooney	Won
Nickelodeon Kids' Choice Awards	March 13, 2021	Favorite Movie Actor	Will Ferrell	Nominated
Set Decorators Society of America Awards	March 31, 2021	Best Achievement in Décor/Design of a Comedy or Musical Feature Film	Naomi Moore and Paul Inglis	Nominated
Society of Composers and Lyricists Awards	March 2, 2021	Outstanding Original Song for Visual Media	Savan Kotecha, Fat Max Gsus, Rickard Göransson for "Husavik"	Won

== Spin-off media and in popular culture ==
For the Eurovision Song Contest 2021, Hannes Óli Ágústsson reprised his role as Olaf Yohansson for the voting segment of the final, in which he presented the points on behalf of the Icelandic jury. In announcing Iceland's jury points, he first asks host Chantal Janzen to play "Jaja Ding Dong" but she refuses, then he attempted to give 12 points to "Jaja Ding Dong"; upon being told that it's impossible to do so, he reluctantly granted the points to Switzerland instead. The Finnish representatives Blind Channel also held up signs saying "Play Jaja Ding Dong" in the green room during the televoting window.

In the same year, the Norwegian representative Tix gained publicity over showing affection for the Azerbaijani representative, Samira Efendi, throughout their time at the contest. Tix was seen singing "Jaja Ding Dong" as a love serenade for Efendi.

In the lead-up to the Eurovision Song Contest 2025, Icelandic contestants Væb covered "Jaja Ding Dong", and UK representatives Remember Monday covered "Husavik".

A stage musical based on the film entered development in 2025, with Ferrell and Steele returning to write the script and Kotecha composing the music. They will be joined by writer Anthony King, producer Lia Vollack, and director Alex Timbers.

At Het Grote Songfestivalfeest in 2025 Molly Sandén performed both "Husavik" and "Jaja Ding Dong", for the latter she was joined on stage by Rylan Clark.

== See also ==
- Iceland in the Eurovision Song Contest
