= Club Majesty =

Studio album by Royal Republic
- Released: 31 May 2019
- Recorded: October–November 2018
- Studio: Hansa, Berlin, Germany
- Genre: New wave; dance-punk; funk rock; electronic rock; progressive rock; disco
- Length: 34:53
- Label: Arising Empire; Nuclear Blast

Royal Republic chronology
Weekend Man (2016)	Club Majesty (2019)	LoveCop (2024)

Singles from Club Majesty
- 1. "Fireman & Dancer" Released: 2019; 2. "Boomerang" Released: 2019; 3. "Anna-Leigh" Released: 2019

Club Majesty is the fourth studio album by Swedish rock band, Royal Republic. The album was released on 31 May 2019 through Nuclear Blast in the U.S. and European Union outside of Germany and Arising Empire in Germany.

Stylistically, the album has been described as a radical departure from the band's previous releases, which fused hard rock, garage rock, and blues rock. Club Majesty has been described by music critics has a hybrid of disco, new wave, and dance punk. The album has been met with positive reviews from contemporary music critics. "Stop Movin'" was featured on the game Just Dance 2020.

== Track listing ==
All lyrics are written by Jonas Almén, Per Andreasson, Adam Grahn, and Hannes Irengård; all music is composed by Royal Republic.

No.	Title	Length
1.	"Fireman & Dancer"	2:48
2.	"Can't Fight the Disco"	2:51
3.	"Boomerang"	3:26
4.	"Under Cover"	3:42
5.	"Like a Lover"	3:53
6.	"Blunt Force Trauma"	2:55
7.	"Fortune Favors"	3:24
8.	"Flower Power Madness"	3:15
9.	"Stop Movin'"	2:58
10.	"Anna-Leigh"	3:15
11.	"Bulldog"	2:26

== Charts ==
Chart (2019)	Peak position
Austrian Albums (Ö3 Austria)	68
German Albums (Offizielle Top 100)	17
Swiss Albums (Schweizer Hitparade)	51
UK Album Downloads (OCC)	98
UK Independent Albums (OCC)	29
UK Rock & Metal Albums (OCC)	10
