= Elín Petersdóttir =

Icelandic-Finnish actor (born 1972)

- Born: 1 June 1972 (age 54); Iceland
- Citizenship: Iceland; Finland
- Occupation: Actress
- Years active: 1998–present
- Known for: Eurovision Song Contest: The Story of Fire Saga; Stars Above; Apeiron

Elín Helena Petersdóttir (born 1 June 1972) is an Icelandic-Finnish theater and film actress. She is known for Eurovision Song Contest: The Story of Fire Saga, Stars Above (Finnish: Tähtitaivas talon yllä) and Apeiron.

== Early life ==
Elín was born in Iceland to actors Borgar Garðarson and Gréta Þórsdóttir. When she was one year old, her family moved to Finland. After her parents divorced, her mother married actor Peter Snickars, a Swedish-speaking Finn. Elín studied acting in Denmark and later at Stella Adler Studio of Acting in New York City.

== Filmography ==
- Unna ja Nuuk (2006) – Kaunisohto
- Stars Above (2012) – Salla
- Apeiron (2013) – Anna
- Hemma (2013) – Eva
- Devil's Bride (2016) – Rakel Larsdotter
- Eurovision Song Contest: The Story of Fire Saga (2020) – Helka
- Natatorium (2024) - Áróra
- To Cook a Bear (2025) - Kristina
