= Ida Königsmarck =

Ida Henningsdotter Königsmarck (died 1450), was a Swedish noble and fief-holder, known for her legendary defense of Kastelholm Castle on Åland in Swedish Finland during the Engelbrekt Rebellion in 1433.

She was the daughter of the nobleman Henning Königsmarck (d. c. 1415), a German immigrated nobleman and adviser of King Eric of Pomerania, and the sister of Governor Bengt Königsmarck of Kalmar; she was thus the paternal aunt of Kristina Königsmarck. She married nobleman Tomas Von Vitzen (c. 1381–1416) firstly, and secondly to Bengt Pogwisch (d. 1432). Her second spouse was an adviser of King Eric from Holstein and the holder of the fief Kastelholm Castle, and after his death in 1432, she took over his position as fief-holder.

In 1433, the castle was besieged by the rebels during the Engelbrekt Rebellion. Her defense of the castle was described in the Karlskrönikan ('Charles Chronicle') and became legend:

Fru Yda en utlänsk Qvinna;
Bättre Konungen henne trodde
Än någon then i Sverige bodde;
Thet var nu Svenskom til spott
At Qvinna skulle råda Riksens Slott

(Lady Ida a foreign woman:
Thought of better by the king
Than any living in Sweden;
Because of this the Swedes were ridiculed
That a woman should rule the castles of the realm)

Other sources claim that her son Otto Pogwisch organized the defense and that he surrendered to the rebels.
