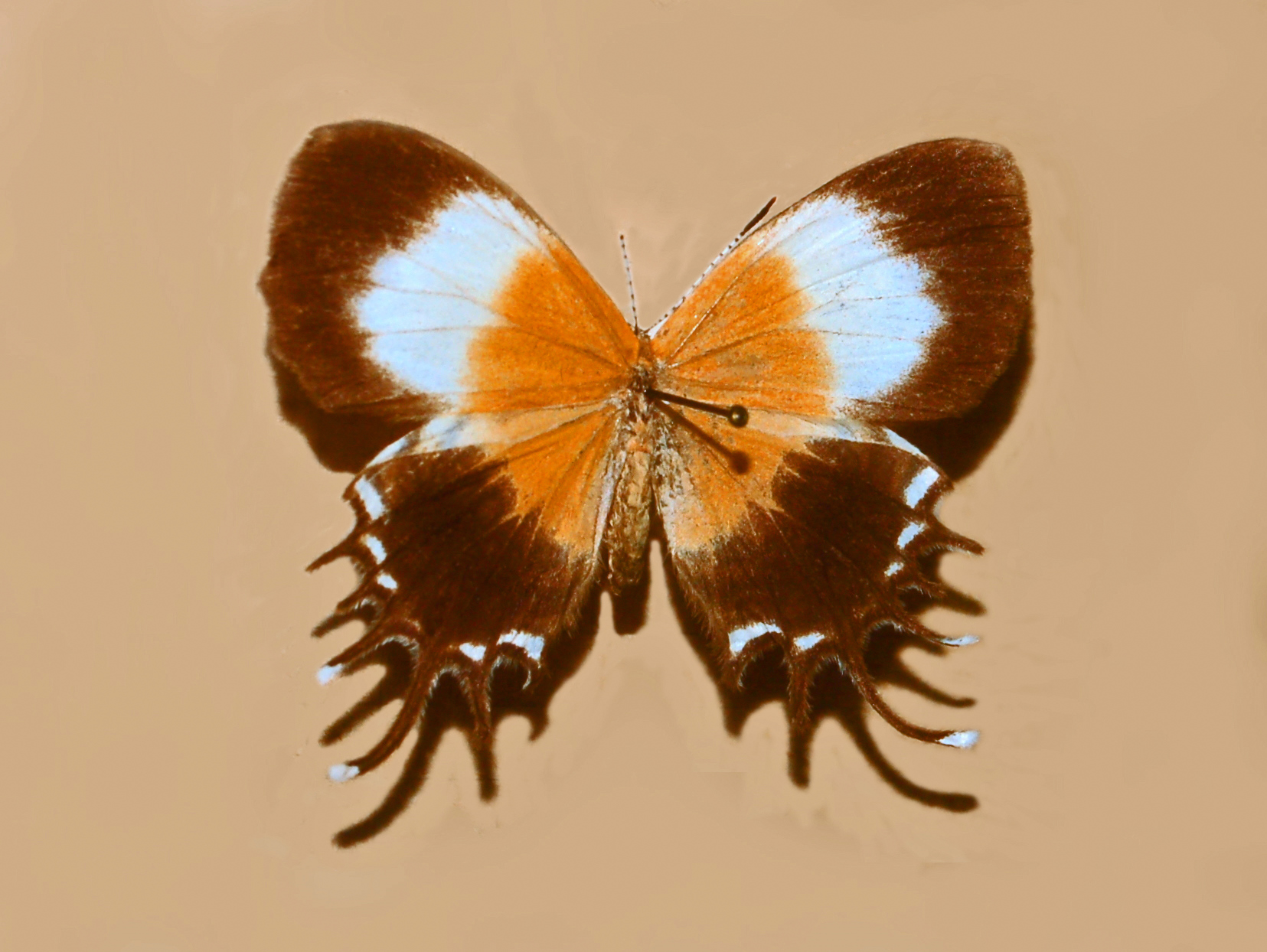
- Mounted specimen from Brazil

Scientific classification
- Kingdom: Animalia
- Phylum: Arthropoda
- Class: Insecta
- Order: Lepidoptera
- Family: Riodinidae
- Genus: Helicopis
- Species: H. gnidus

Binomial name
- Helicopis gnidus (Fabricius, 1787)

Synonyms
- Papilio gnidus Fabricius, 1787; Papilio acis Fabricius, 1781 (preocc. Drury, 1773); Helicopis acis curusamba Le Moult, 1939; Helicopis acis curusamba f. subandrogyne Le Moult, 1939; Helicopis acis curusamba f. albocincta Le Moult, 1939; Helicopis acis curusamba f. subalbocincta Le Moult, 1939; Helicopis acis curusamba f. pseudalbescens Le Moult, 1939; Helicopis acis curusamba f. nigromaculata Le Moult, 1939; Helicopis acis santaremensis Le Moult, 1939; Helicopis acis tapajonus Le Moult, 1939; Helicopis fournierae Le Moult, 1939; Helicopis fournierae f. diluta Le Moult, 1939; Helicopis albescens Le Moult, 1939; Helicopis albescens paraensis Le Moult, 1939; Helicopis wardi Le Moult, 1939; Helicopis interrupta manicorensis Le Moult, 1939; Helicopis interrupta manicorensis f. sulphurea Le Moult, 1939; Helicopis interrupta pseudoalbocincta Le Moult, 1939; Helicopis interrupta putumayensis Le Moult, 1939; Helicopis interrupta solimoensis Le Moult, 1939; Helicopis amazonica Le Moult, 1939; Helicopis lesoudierae Le Moult, 1939; Helicopis lesoudierae fleuryi Le Moult, 1939; Helicopis lesoudierae madeirensis Le Moult, 1939; Helicopis poleti Le Moult, 1939; Helicopis poleti teffeensis Le Moult, 1939; Helicopis acis nigrobasalis f. conspecifica Bryk, 1953; Helicopis acis obidonus f. androgyne Le Moult, 1939

= Helicopis gnidus =

Species of butterfly

Helicopis gnidus, the gnidus metalmark or spider-wing cupid, is a species of butterfly in the family Riodinidae.

== Description ==
In Helicopis gnidus the uppersides of the wings are mainly black, with a large orange basal area, followed by a broad patch of white. The hindwings have iridescent patches (or "metalmarks") as well as several long tails.

== Distribution ==
This species occurs in the northern countries of South America, mainly in Suriname, Brazil, Peru and Colombia.

== Subspecies ==
- Helicopis gnidus gnidus (Suriname)
- Helicopis gnidus beaulieui Le Moult, 1939
- Helicopis gnidus galatea Stichel, 1919 (Brazil)
- Helicopis gnidus interrupta Le Moult, 1939 (Peru, Brazil, Colombia)
- Helicopis gnidus medialis Schaus & Cockerell, 1923 (Colombia)
- Helicopis gnidus nigrobasalis Aurivillius, 1929 (Brazil)
- Helicopis gnidus obidonus Le Moult, 1939 (Brazil)
