= Devil's Bride (2016 film) =

2016 Finnish drama film

- Directed by: Saara Cantell
- Starring: Magnus Krepper; Antti Reini
- Release date: 9 September 2016
- Running time: 110 minutes
- Country: Finland
- Languages: Swedish, Finnish

Devil's Bride (Finnish: Tulen morsian) is a 2016 Finnish drama film directed by Saara Cantell. The film is based on the Kastelholm witch trials.

== Synopsis ==
Anna is a maid who starts an affair with the married Elias, who has a young son and a newborn daughter with Rakel. After being confronted by Rakel, who pleads with Anna to end the affair so Elias can be a proper father to their children, Anna refuses, arguing that her bond with Elias is stronger than life. Rakel tells Anna this is not the first affair Elias has had, saying he likes beautiful young girls. Anna becomes angry and says Rakel is a bitter old hag.

Later that night, starting to doubt Elias' devotion to her, Anna sneaks into Elias and Rakel's home, watching them smile and cuddle in bed, appearing as happy and in love as Anna thought she and Elias were. Jealous and angry, Anna accuses Rakel of toiling in witchcraft, using herbs to heal. A number of women are arrested at the same time. When a woman is sentenced to beheading and then being burned at the stake, Anna regrets her lies against Rakel. Anna goes to Elias and Rakel's home in the evening, taking care of Rakel's young children while an exhausted neighbor goes home. Elias arrives back home, and kisses her, despite his wife sitting in a dungeon. Anna confesses that her lies had Rakel arrested and Elias is furious, despite her admitting she only hoped Rakel would be banished, allowing her to marry Elias.

Eventually, Elias leaves the town, abandoning his children and wife, to sail at sea. Anna's guilt consumes her, and to save Rakel's newborn daughter from starvation, she brings the baby to the dungeon, where a guard softens and allows her to pass. Rakel and Anna speak, and Anna expresses great regret for her lies. When Anna steals Holy Water so the baby may be baptized, Rakel decides to forgive Anna, and names her daughter Anna Ilianna. At the climax of the movie, Anna confesses her lies, and is arrested herself, on suspicion the Devil maybe making her lie. Anna makes a long confession, saying the Devil is hard to recognize, and that he makes you feel strong and powerful, and makes you "howl like a bitch" before making you fly (all reference to her relationship with Elias, which led her down the path of sin). Anna is sentenced to death for witchcraft and Rakel is set free.

On the day of the execution, Anna's fate is left ambiguous. Years later, Rakel is living happily by the sea with her children. Anna Ilianna reads a book from "Big Anna" and asks her mother to tell her what happened to her again. Anna Ilianna tells her mother that Rakel dyed the Holy Water at the execution red, making the reverend believe it was a divine miracle, that water had turned to wine. Anna was freed and relocated to Stockholm where she became a rich and famous healer. The truth is revealed as the camera settles on Rakel, who remembers that the happy ending did not happen, and that Anna was beheaded. Seven women in total were executed for witchcraft in 1666.

== Cast ==
- Magnus Krepper as Nils Psilander
- Antti Reini as Karl Jönsson
- Tuulia Eloranta as Anna Eriksdotter
- Elín Petersdóttir as Rakel Larsdotter
- Clas-Ove Bruun as Pyöveli
- Claes Malmberg as Bryniel Kjellinus
- Maria Sid as Lisbeta Skarp
