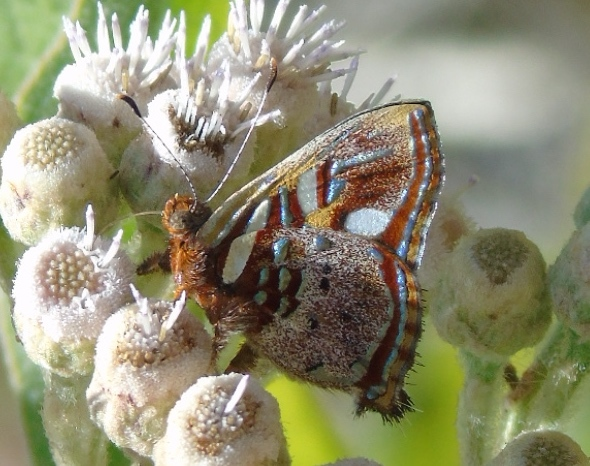
- Anteros carausius

Scientific classification
- Kingdom: Animalia
- Phylum: Arthropoda
- Class: Insecta
- Order: Lepidoptera
- Family: Riodinidae
- Subfamily: Riodininae
- Tribe: Helicopini
- Genus: Anteros; Hübner, [1819]

Synonyms
- Chrysilis Westwood, 1851

= Anteros (butterfly) =

Genus of butterflies

Anteros is a Neotropical genus of butterflies of the family Riodinidae. The species of this genus are immediately recognizable by the under surface in which small, brown or black-bordered spots with metallic centres stand on the light yellow ground. The upper surface is mostly black with a yellowish central spot. Morphologically, the species are distinguished by two characteristics:by the long cilia at the anal angle of the hindwing and by dense, brightly coloured flocks of hair at the legs. Most of the species are not common; they mostly rest on the under surface of leaves with their wings spread out, but sometimes they clap their wings together above the back.

== List of species ==
- Anteros acheus (Stoll, 1781) Suriname, Bolivia, Brazil
- Anteros aerosus Stichel, 1924 Guyana, Brazil
- Anteros allectus Westwood, 1851 Costa Rica, Colombia, Ecuador, Brazil
- Anteros aurigans Gallard & Brévignon, 1989 French Guiana
- Anteros bracteata Hewitson, 1867 Brazil
- Anteros carausius Westwood, 1851 Mexico, Panama, Ecuador, Venezuela, Bolivia
- Anteros chrysoprasta Hewitson, 1867 Panama, Guatemala, Brazil, Peru
- Anteros cruentatus Stichel, 1911 Bolivia
- Anteros formosus (Cramer, [1777]) Panama, Honduras, Suriname, Bolivia, Colombia, Peru
- Anteros gentilis (Rebillard, 1958) Peru
- Anteros kupris Hewitson, 1875 Costa Rica, Colombia, Bolivia, Peru
- Anteros lectabilis Stichel, 1909 Brazil
- Anteros nubosus Hall & Willmott, 1995 Ecuador
- Anteros otho Westwood, 1851 Brazil
- Anteros principalis Hopffer, 1874 Colombia, Ecuador, Peru
- Anteros renaldus (Stoll, [1790]) Suriname, Panama, Nicaragua, Brazil

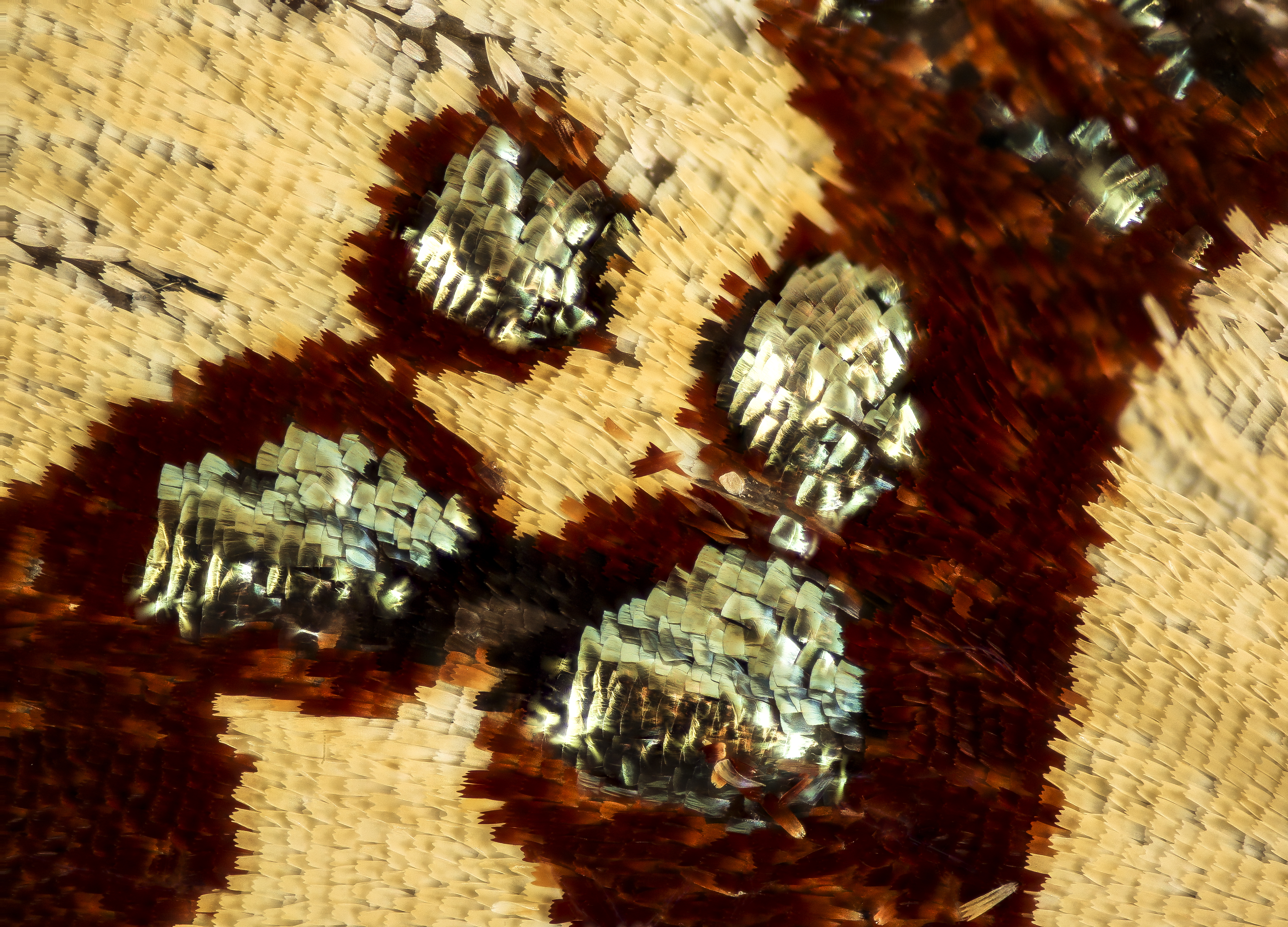
Anteros formosus detail
