= Jonas Almén =

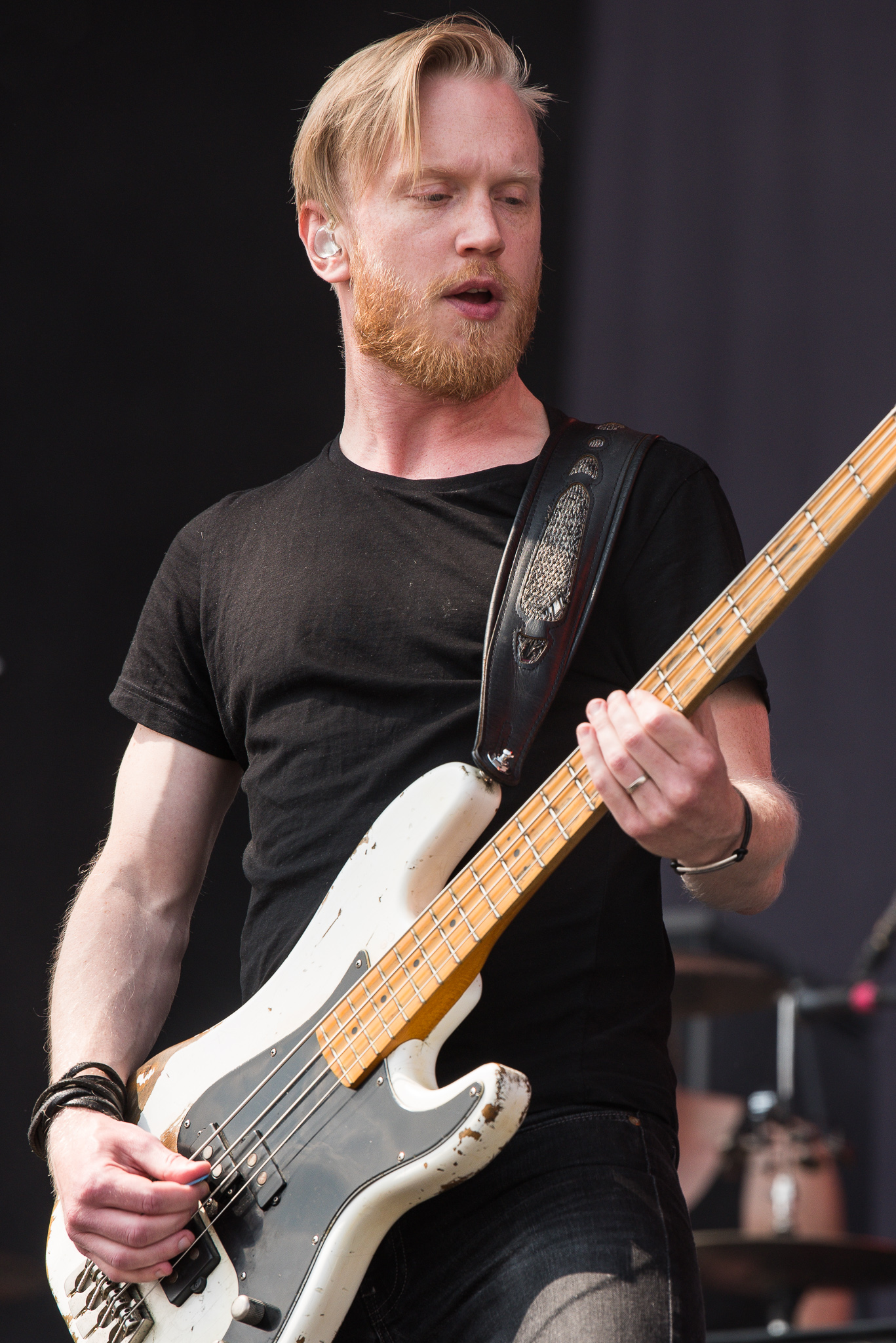
- Almén live 2015

Background information
- Born: Jonas Kristoffer Almén; 19 December 1984 (age 41); Färjestaden, Sweden
- Genres: Alternative rock, garage rock, hard rock, punk rock
- Occupations: Musician, songwriter
- Instruments: Bass, vocals
- Years active: 2007–present
- Label: Universal
- Member of: Royal Republic
- Website: Royal Republic Officiell website

Jonas Kristoffer Almén (born 19 November 1984 in Färjestaden) is a Swedish bassist, singer and songwriter. He is co-founder of the swedish rock band Royal Republic.

== Career ==
Jonas Almén studied Music at the Malmö Academy of Music. In 2007 he founded the band „Royal Republic" along with three other students Adam Grahn (vocals, guitar), Hannes Irengård (guitar) and Per Andreasson (drums). The band recorded their first album, We are the Royal in 2010 in Malmö. In 2012 they released their second album titled Save the Nation. The third album Royal Republic and the Nosebreakers with songs from the previous albums re-interpreted in an acoustic and country-like way was released in 2014. In 2016 the Swedes recorded their fourth album Weekendman. Last three albums were recorded by Michael Ilbert at Hansa Studio 1 and Hansa Mix Room. The band has signed a contract with Vertigo/Universal Music. Royal Republic are active on the touring circuit in Europe and the United States.

The band played at the tradition-rich German festivals Rock am Ring, Rock im Park and the Highfield-Festival.

== Other activities ==
- Songs..: In 2015 he became singer and songwriter for MP3 Album Songs...
- Pudgy: In 1999/2002 Jonas Almén was engaged as guitarist in swedish Rockband Pugdy.
- Actor: In tv-music-talk-show Mulatschag he played himself.

== Discography ==
see Royal Republic Discography
