= Per Andreasson =

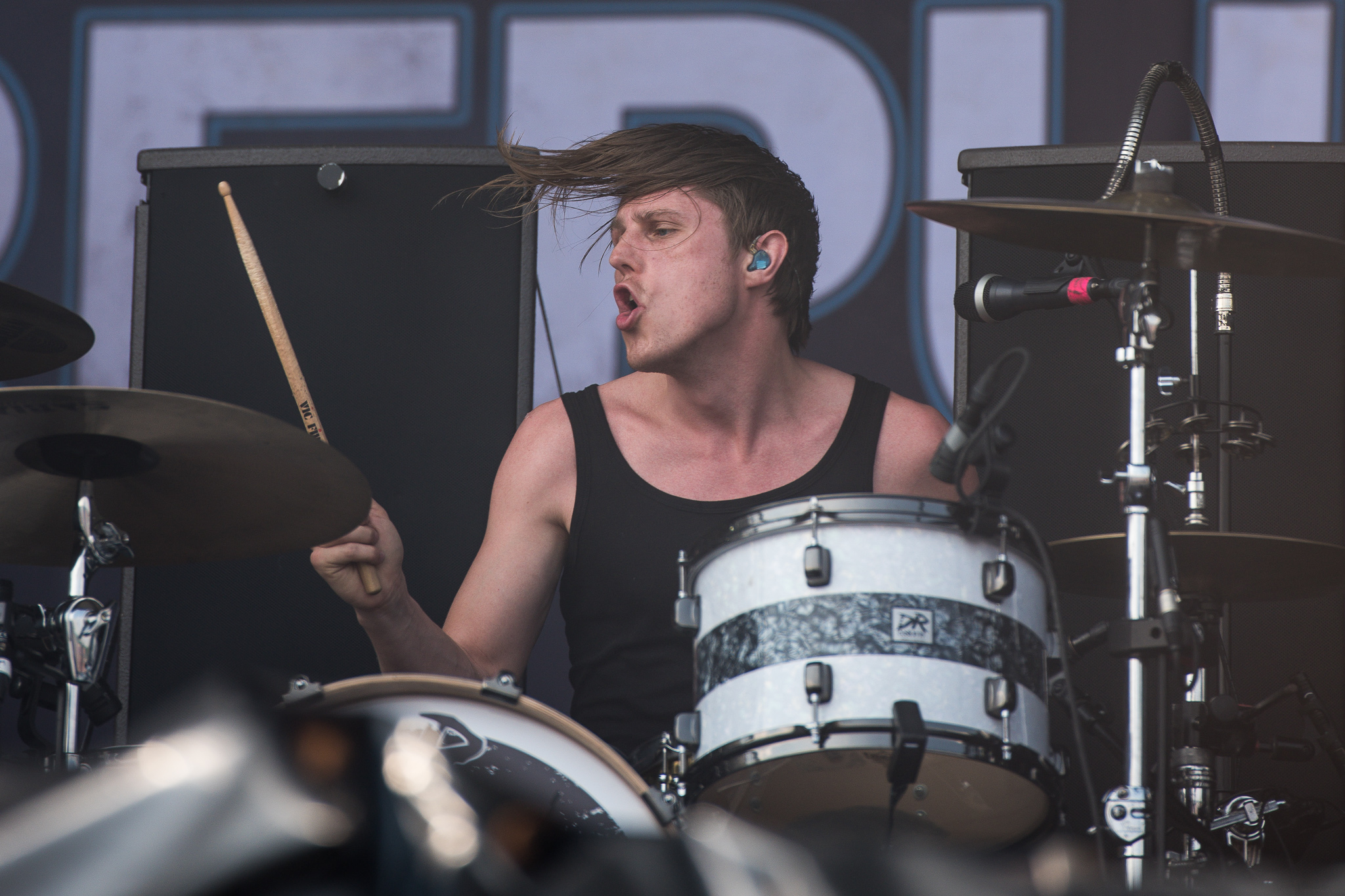
- Per Andreasson live 2015

Background information
- Born: Per Rickard Henrik Andreasson; 18 February 1981 (age 45); Mariefred, Sweden
- Genres: Alternative rock, garage rock, hard rock, punk rock
- Occupations: Musician, songwriter
- Instruments: Drums, vocals
- Years active: 2007–present
- Label: Universal
- Website: Royal Republic Officiell website

Per Rickard Henrik Andreasson (born 18 February 1981 in Mariefred) is a Swedish drummer, singer and songwriter. He is co-founder of the Swedish rock band Royal Republic.

== Career ==
Per Andreasson studied Music at the Malmö Academy of Music. In 2007 he founded the band "Royal Republic" along with three other students Adam Grahn (vocals, guitar), Jonas Almén (bass) and Hannes Irengård (guitar). The band recorded their first album, We are the Royal in 2010 in Malmö. In 2012 they released their second album titled Save the Nation. The third album Royal Republic and the Nosebreakers with songs from the previous albums re-interpreted in an acoustic and country-like way was released in 2014. In 2016 the Swedes recorded their fourth album "Weekendman". Last three albums were recorded by Michael Ilbert at Hansa Studio 1 and Hansa Mix Room. The band has signed a contract with Vertigo/Universal Music. Royal Republic are active on the touring circuit in Europe and the United States. The band played at the tradition-rich German festivals Rock am Ring, Rock im Park and the Highfield-Festival.

== Other activities ==
- Classical Artist/Classical Composer: Per Andreasson is the composer of percussion quartet Tin-Play.
- Classical Soloist: Per Andreasson has a master of classical percussion. He performed as Soloist on classic percussion pieces as: Night of the Moon Dances, Twilight, Mudra
- Rednex: He briefly played drums for Rednex.

== Discography ==
see Royal Republic Discography
