= Anteros (band) =

English band

- Origin: London, England
- Genre: Indie pop
- Years active: 2014–present
- Label: Distiller
- Members: Laura Hayden; Joshua Rumble; Jackson Couzens; Harry Balazs
- Past members: Charles Monneraud
- Website: www.anterosofficial.com

Anteros are an English indie pop band from London. The band formed in 2014, and is made up of Laura Hayden (vocals), Joshua Rumble (bass guitar), Jackson Couzens (guitar) and Harry Balazs (drums).

The band started off with Laura Hayden and Joshua Rumble who released their debut self-titled single - to today's lineup, which has seen the group hit the road on tour with Two Door Cinema Club, Blaenavon, and White Lies, as well as playing at Glastonbury and Reading & Leeds festivals.

In 2020, the band briefly appeared in Eurovision Song Contest: The Story of Fire Saga portraying The Wonderfour, Finland's representatives in the fictional edition of the Eurovision Song Contest depicted in the movie with the song Fool Moon.

== Members ==
- Laura Hayden - Vocals
- Joshua Rumble - Bass Guitar
- Jackson Couzens - Guitar
- Harry Balazs - Drums

== Former members ==
- Charles Monneraud - Guitar

== Discography ==
=== Albums ===
- When We Land (2019)

=== Extended plays ===
- Anteros EP (2015)
- Breakfast EP (2016)
- Drunk EP (2017)

=== Singles ===
- "Breakfast" (2016)
- "Blue" (2016)
- "The Beat" (2016)
- "Drunk" (2017)
- "Cherry Drop" (2017)
- "Bonnie" (2017)
- "Love" (2018)
- "Call Your Mother" (2018)
