= Anteros Coachworks =

Anteros Coachworks Inc.
- Type: Private
- Industry: Automotive
- Founded: 2005
- Founder: Roger Hector
- Headquarters: San Jose, California, United States
- Key people: Roger Hector (Owner and Chief Designer)
- Products: Sports cars
- Website: rogerhector.com/anteroscoachworks.html

Anteros

Overview
- Production: 2006-2009

Body and chassis
- Class: Sports car (S)
- Body style: 2-door coupé 2-door convertible
- Layout: Front mid-engine, rear-wheel-drive
- Related: Chevrolet Corvette (C6)

Powertrain
- Engine: 6.0 L LS2 V8; 6.2 L LS3 V8; 7.0 L LS7 V8
- Transmission: 6-speed manual

Dimensions
- Wheelbase: 105.7 in (2,685 mm)
- Length: 181 in (4,600 mm)
- Width: 79 in (2,000 mm)
- Height: 49 in (1,200 mm)
- Curb weight: 3,400 lb (1,542 kg)

Anteros Coachworks Inc. is an American sports car manufacturer based in California. The company was established in 2005 by Roger Hector.

The Anteros sports car is based on the C6 Corvette and equipped with a supercharged LS2 engine with over 500 horsepower. It was built at the company’s California-based facility from 2006 to 2009, with a production cost of $149,500 per unit.
