= Weekend Man =

Studio album by Royal Republic
- Released: 26 February 2016
- Recorded: 2015
- Studio: Fuzzfactory, Berlin
- Genre: Hard rock
- Length: 39:50
- Label: Capitol
- Producer: Christian Neander

Royal Republic chronology
Save the Nation (2012)	Weekend Man (2016)	Club Majesty (2019)

Singles from Weekend Man
- 1. "When I See You Dance With Another" Released: 20 November 2015; 2. "Baby" Released: 15 January 2016; 3. "Uh Huh" Released: 19 February 2016

Weekend Man is the third studio album by Swedish rock band, Royal Republic. The album was released on 26 February 2016 through Capitol Records.

== Track listing ==
All lyrics are written by Jonas Almén, Per Andreasson, Adam Grahn, and Hannes Irengård; all music is composed by Royal Republic.

No.	Title	Length
1.	"Here I Come (There You Go)"	3:27
2.	"Walk!"	2:54
3.	"When I See You Dance with Another"	2:49
4.	"People Say That I'm Over the Top"	2:56
5.	"Kung Fu Lovin'"	2:55
6.	"Weekend-Man"	3:21
7.	"My Way"	3:03
8.	"Follow the Sun"	3:39
9.	"Uh Huh"	2:17
10.	"Any Given Sunday"	3:31
11.	"Baby"	2:51
12.	"High Times!"	2:12
13.	"American Dream"	3:29
Total length:		39:50

Spotify deluxe edition
No.	Title	Length
14.	"Getting Along"	2:17
15.	"Playball"	2:28
Total length:		44:35

== Personnel ==
The following individuals were credited for the production of this album.

Royal Republic

- Jonas Almén
- Per Andreasson
- Adam Grahn
- Hannes Irengård

Production

- Michael Ibert – Mixing
- Christian Neander – Producing
- Michael Tibes – Producing
- Michael Tibes – Recording
- Tom Coyne – Mastering
- Michael Ilbert – Mixing
- Udo Masshoff – Drum Technician

Creative

- Rocket & Wink – Artwork
- Erik Weiss – Photography

== Charts ==
Chart (2016)	Peak position
Austrian Albums (Ö3 Austria)	45
German Albums (Offizielle Top 100)	15
Swiss Albums (Schweizer Hitparade)	93
UK Rock & Metal Albums (OCC)	28
