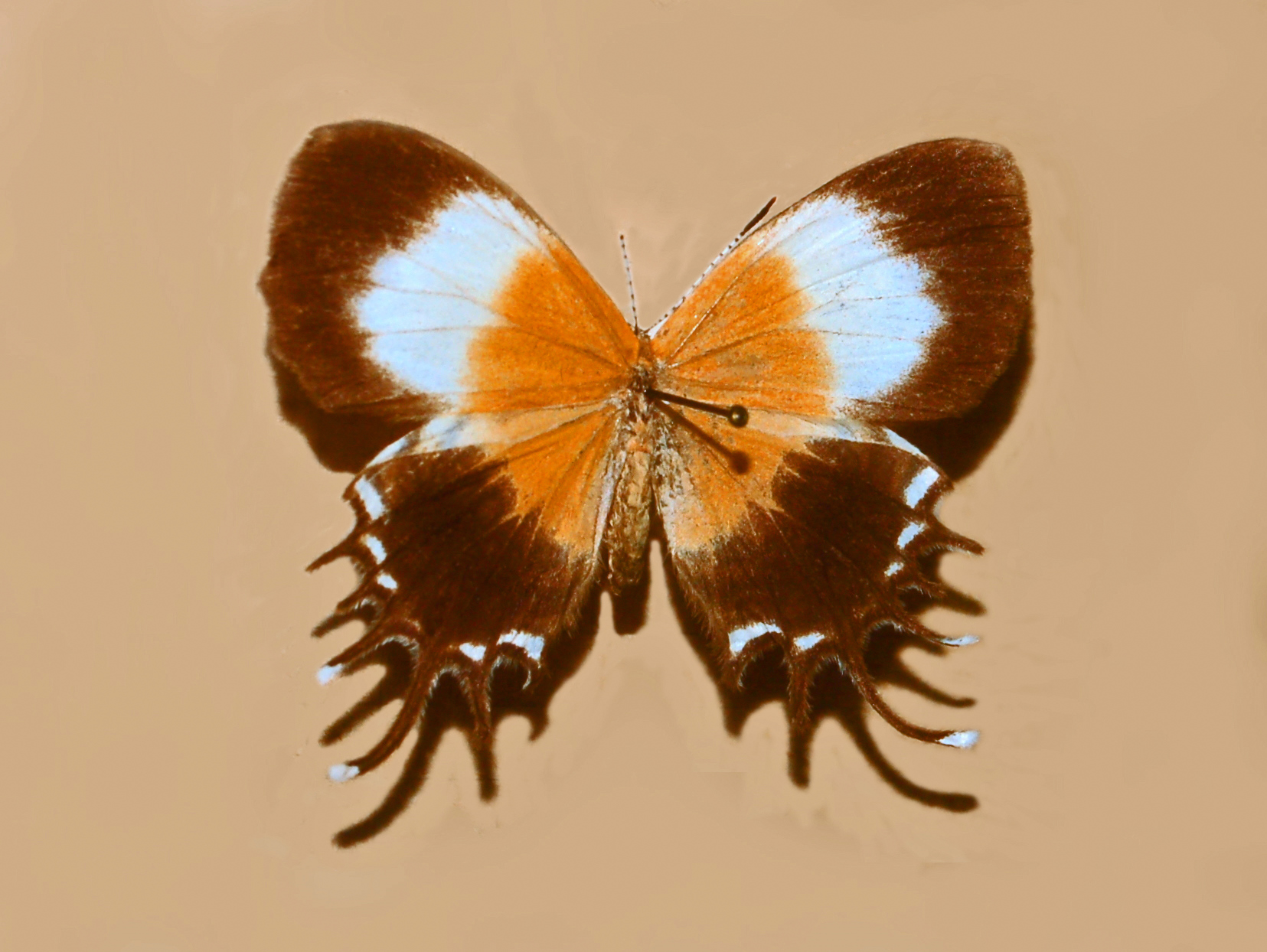
- Mounted Helicopis gnidus from Brazil

Scientific classification
- Domain: Eukaryota
- Kingdom: Animalia
- Phylum: Arthropoda
- Class: Insecta
- Order: Lepidoptera
- Family: Riodinidae
- Genus: Helicopis; Fabricius, 1807

Synonyms
- Rusticus Hübner, [1807]; Hexuropteris Hübner, [1819]; Erotion Billberg, 1820

= Helicopis =

Genus of butterflies

Helicopis is a Neotropical genus of butterflies of the family Riodinidae.

== List of species ==
- Helicopis gnidus (Fabricius, 1787
- Helicopis cupido (Linnaeus, 1758)
- Helicopis endymiaena (Hübner, [1819])
