= 1943 Anteros =

Rare-type, spheroidal Amor asteroid

Discovery
- Discovered by: J. B. Gibson
- Discovery site: El Leoncito Complex
- Discovery date: 13 March 1973

Designations
- Pronunciation: /ˈæntərɒs/
- Named after: Anteros (Greek mythology)
- Alternative designations: 1973 EC
- Minor planet category: Amor · NEO

Orbital characteristics
- Epoch 4 September 2017 (JD 2458000.5)
- Uncertainty parameter 0
- Observation arc: 44.02 yr (16,080 days)
- Aphelion: 1.7968 AU
- Perihelion: 1.0642 AU
- Semi-major axis: 1.4305 AU
- Eccentricity: 0.2561
- Orbital period (sidereal): 1.71 yr (625 days)
- Mean anomaly: 332.17°
- Inclination: 8.7061°
- Longitude of ascending node: 246.33°
- Argument of perihelion: 338.37°
- Earth MOID: 0.0630 AU · 24.5 LD

Physical characteristics
- Dimensions: 2.01 km (derived); 2.38±0.72 km 2.39 km 2.43 km
- Synodic rotation period: 2.735±0.003 h 2.867±0.001 h 2.8695 h 2.9±0.1 h 3 h 6.5209±0.0022 h
- Geometric albedo: 0.138±0.107; 0.15; 0.17; 0.18 (assumed)
- Spectral type: S (Tholen) · L (SMASS); Sq · S · L B–V = 0.841; U–B = 0.444
- Absolute magnitude (H): 15.00 · 15.449±0.002 (R) · 15.75 · 15.8 · 15.82±0.14 · 15.89±0.14 · 15.9±0.2 · 15.96 · 16.01 · 16.35±0.48

1943 Anteros /ˈæntərɒs/, provisional designation 1973 EC, is a spheroidal, rare-type asteroid and near-Earth object of the Amor group, approximately 2 kilometers in diameter.

It was discovered on 13 March 1973, by American astronomer James Gibson at the Leoncito Astronomical Complex in Argentina, and named for the Greek god Anteros.

== Orbit and classification ==
Anteros is an Amor asteroid, which approaches the orbit of Earth from beyond but does not cross it. It orbits the Sun at a distance of 1.1–1.8 AU once every 1 year and 9 months (625 days). Its orbit has an eccentricity of 0.26 and an inclination of 9° with respect to the ecliptic.

The near-Earth object has an Earth minimum orbit intersection distance of 0.0630 AU (9,420,000 km) or 24.5 lunar distances, which is slightly above the defined limit of 0.05 AU for potentially hazardous objects.

The body's observation arc begins 3 days prior to its official discovery observation in 1973, as a 1968-precovery from Palomar remained unused.

== Physical characteristics ==
In the Tholen classification, Anteros is a common S-type asteroid, while in the SMASS taxonomy, it is a relatively rare L-type asteroid, described as a reddish but otherwise featureless stony asteroid. It has also been characterized as a Sq subtype, which transitions to the Q-type asteroids.

=== Rotation period ===
Several rotational lightcurves of Anteros were obtained from photometric observations by Brian Warner, Petr Pravec, the Palomar Transient Factory and others since the 1980s. One of the best-rated and most recent lightcurves was obtained at the Palmer Divide Station (716) in December 2013, and gave a rotation period of 2.867 hours with a brightness variation of 0.1 magnitude, which indicates that Anteros has a nearly spheroidal shape (U=3).

=== Diameter and albedo ===
According to the EXPLORENEOs survey carried out by the Spitzer Space Telescope, Anteros measures between 2.38 and 2.43 kilometers in diameter, and its surface has an albedo of 0.138 to 0.170. The Collaborative Asteroid Lightcurve Link assumes an albedo of 0.18 and derives a diameter of 2.0 kilometers with an absolute magnitude of 15.89.

== Naming ==
This minor planet was named after the Greek god Anteros, avenger of unrequited love and punisher of those who scorn love and the advances of others. The asteroid's name may have been chosen because its orbit is similar to the asteroid 433 Eros, and in Greek mythology, Anteros was said to be the twin brother of Eros. The official naming citation was published by the Minor Planet Center on 15 October 1977 (M.P.C. 4237).
