= Adam Grahn =

Swedish musician

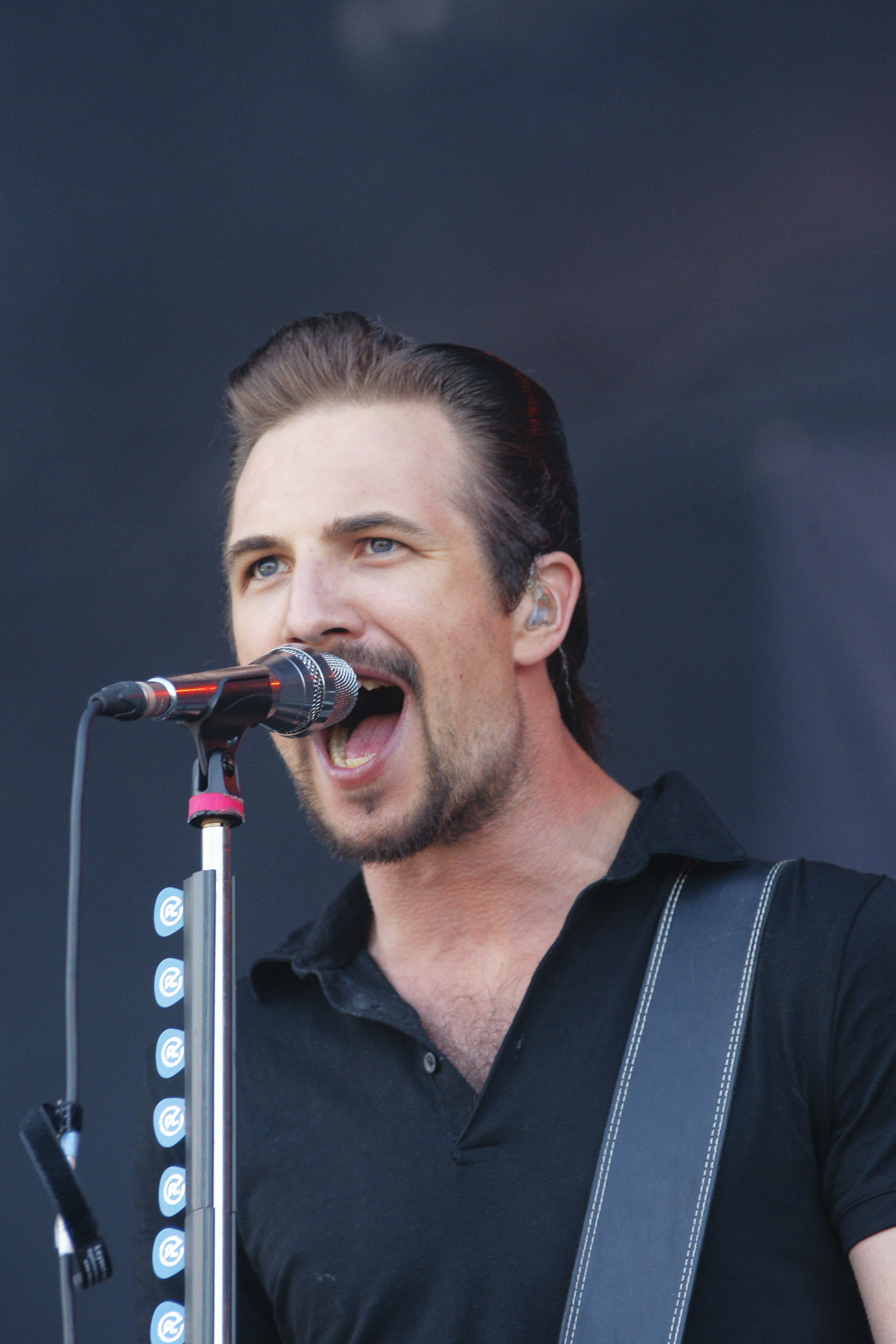
- Adam Grahn live 2013

Background information
- Born: John Carl Adam Grahn; 4 November 1984 (age 41); Karlskrona, Blekinge, Sweden
- Genres: Alternative rock, garage rock, hard rock, punk rock
- Occupations: Musician, songwriter
- Instruments: Vocals, guitar
- Years active: 2007–present
- Label: Universal
- Website: Royal Republic Officiell website

John Carl Adam Grahn (born 4 November 1984 in Karlskrona) is a Swedish rock singer, songwriter, and guitarist. He is founder and frontman of the Swedish rock band Royal Republic.

== Life ==
Adam Grahn was born in Karlskrona into a family of musicians. He is the son of Håkan Grahn and Monika Lindeborg-Grahn. He has a younger brother, songwriter, and producer Max Grahn. When touring with his parents, he played his first show with them at the age of five on the drums. At the age of eleven, he began playing guitar. He himself enjoys many bands such as Metallica, Tom Petty, U2, Crosby, Stills and Nash.

== Career ==
Adam studied Music at the Malmö Academy of Music. In 2007 he founded the band "Royal Republic" along with three other students Hannes Irengård (guitar), Jonas Almén (bass) and Per Andreasson (drums). The band recorded their first album, "We are the Royal" in 2010 in Malmö. In 2012 they released their second album titled. "Save the Nation." The third album. "Royal Republic and the Nosebreakers" with songs from the previous albums re-interpreted in an acoustic and country-like way was released in 2014. In 2016 the Swedes recorded their fourth album "Weekendman." Last three albums were recorded by Michael Ilbert at Hansa Studio 1 and Hansa Mix Room. The band has signed a contract with Vertigo/Universal Music. Royal Republic are active on the touring circuit in Europe and the United States. The band played at the tradition-rich German festivals Rock am Ring, Rock im Park and the Highfield-Festival.

== Other activities ==
- Producer: In 2017 Adam Grahn became producer for Tim Vantols new album Burning Desires and its lead single "Till the End".
- Stilla nätters kapell: Since 2011 he is a basic member of Swedish supergroup „Stilla nätters kapell".
- Chocolate Chip: In 2003/2004 Adam Grahn was engaged as guitarist in Swedish funkband "Chocolate Chip".
- Actor: In TV music-talk-show Mulatschag he played himself in episode 1198 aired 21 October 2011.
- Actor: Eurovision Song Contest: The Story of Fire Saga as Male Vocalist of the fictional band 'Moon Fang' singing "Running with the Wolves".

== Discography ==
see Royal Republic Discography
