= Hannes Irengård =

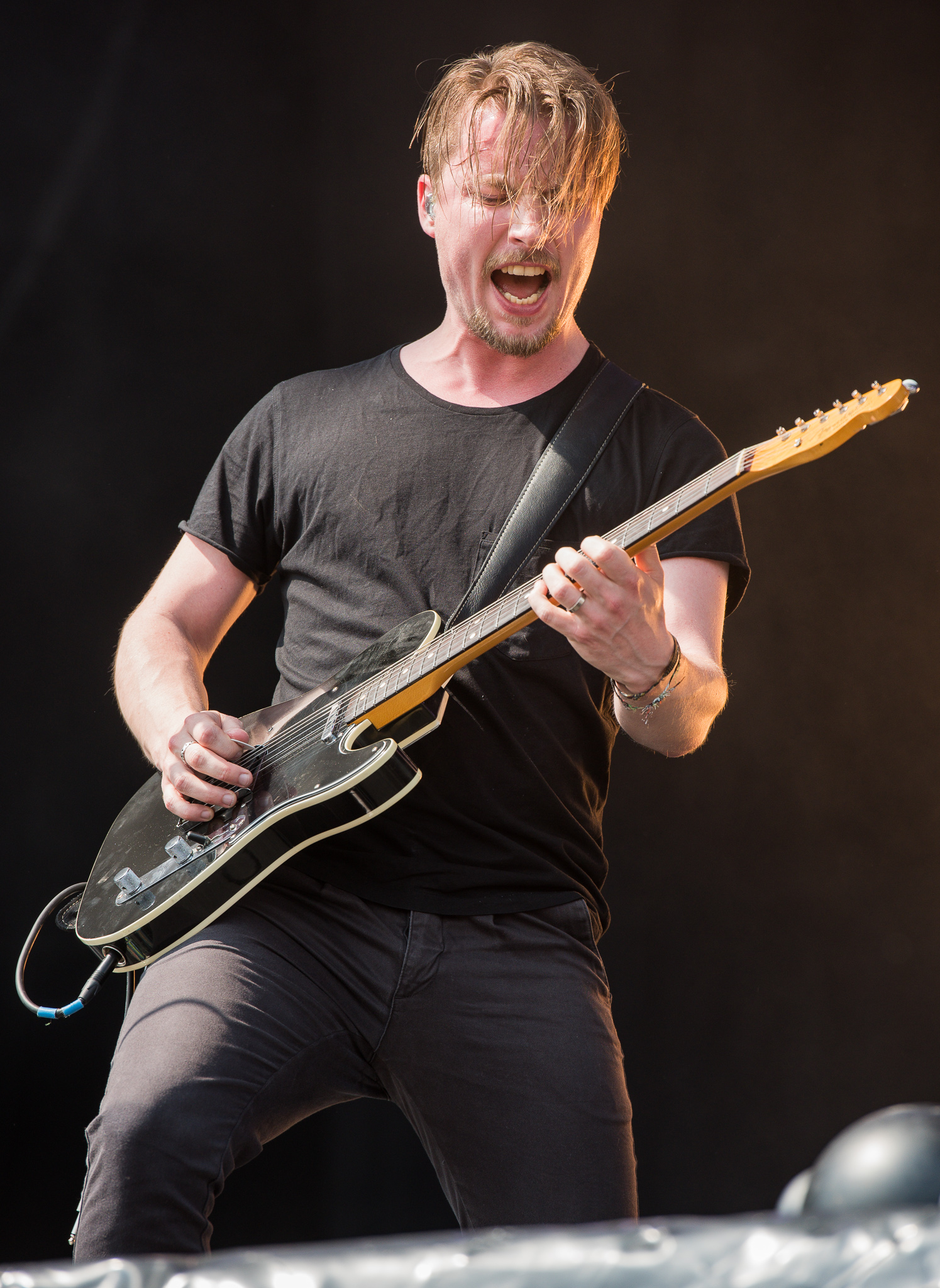
- Hannes Irengård live 2015

Background information
- Born: Hannes Viktor Hugo Irengård; 12 February 1982 (age 44); Malmö, Sweden
- Genres: Alternative rock, garage rock, hard rock, punk rock
- Occupations: Musician, songwriter
- Instruments: Guitar, vocals
- Years active: 2007–present
- Label: Universal
- Website: Royal Republic Officiell website

Hannes Viktor Hugo Irengård (born 12 February 1982 in Malmö) is a Swedish guitarist, singer, and songwriter. He is co-founder of the Swedish rock-band Royal Republic.

== Career ==
Hannes Irengård studied music at the Malmö Academy of Music. In 2007 he founded the band „Royal Republic" along with three other students Adam Grahn (vocals, guitar), Jonas Almén (bass) and Per Andreasson (drums). The band recorded their first album, ’’We are the Royal’’ in 2010 in Malmö. In 2012 they released their second album titled ’’Save the Nation’’. The third album ’’Royal Republic and the Nosebreakers’’ with songs from the previous albums re-interpreted in an acoustic and country-like way was released in 2014. In 2016 the Swedes recorded their fourth album „Weekendman". Last three albums were recorded by Michael Ilbert at Hansa Studio 1 and Hansa Mix Room. The band has signed a contract with Vertigo/Universal Music. Royal Republic are active on the touring circuit in Europe and the United States. The band played at the tradition-rich German festivals Rock am Ring, Rock im Park and the Highfield-Festival.

== Other activities ==
- Author: Hannes Irengård is author of a scientific study with the title: Go for it!“
- Malmö Musikhögskola-Project: Spanish Guitar Music Performance together with Cecilia Salazar, other swedish musicians and the band "La Sonora".
- Actor: In tv-music-talk-show Mulatschag he played himself.

== Discography ==
See Royal Republic Discography
