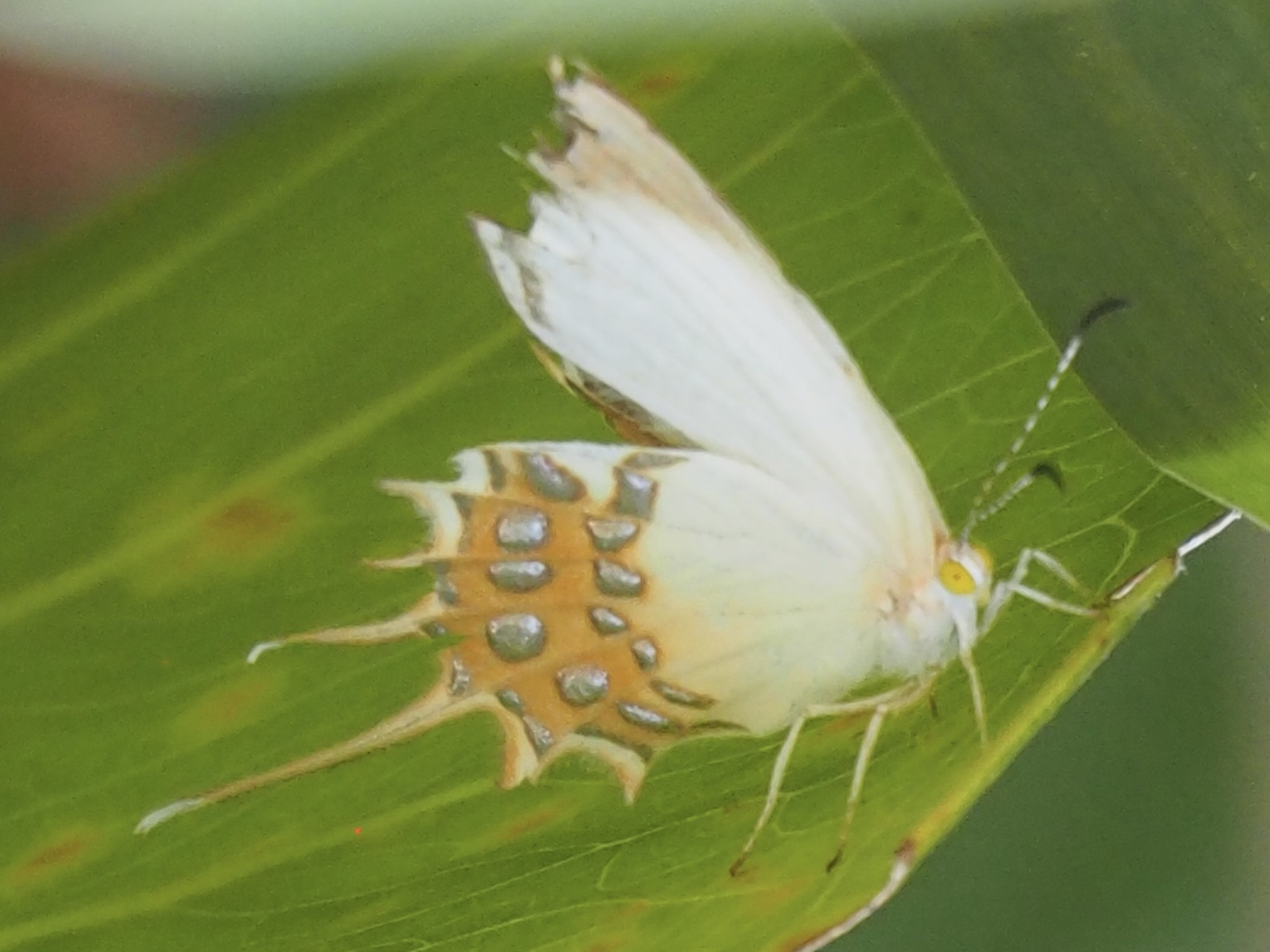

Scientific classification
- Kingdom: Animalia
- Phylum: Arthropoda
- Class: Insecta
- Order: Lepidoptera
- Family: Riodinidae
- Genus: Helicopis
- Species: H. cupido

Binomial name
- Helicopis cupido (Linnaeus, 1758)

= Helicopis cupido =

Species of butterflies

Helicopis cupido, the gold-drop helicopis or spangled cupid, is a species of butterfly from the genus Helicopis, it is found in America.

== Description ==
Helicopis cupido is a creamy-white butterfly resembling Helicopis acis. Its wing has narrow black borders and the base of the fore-wings is yellowish. Under favourable conditions, its pearly white colour might have a metallic shine. The head of the larva is red, but otherwise, it is very similar to that of H. acis.
