= Malmö Academy of Music =

Music school in Malmö, Sweden

Coordinates: 55°34′47″N 13°0′59″E

- Musikhögskolan i Malmö
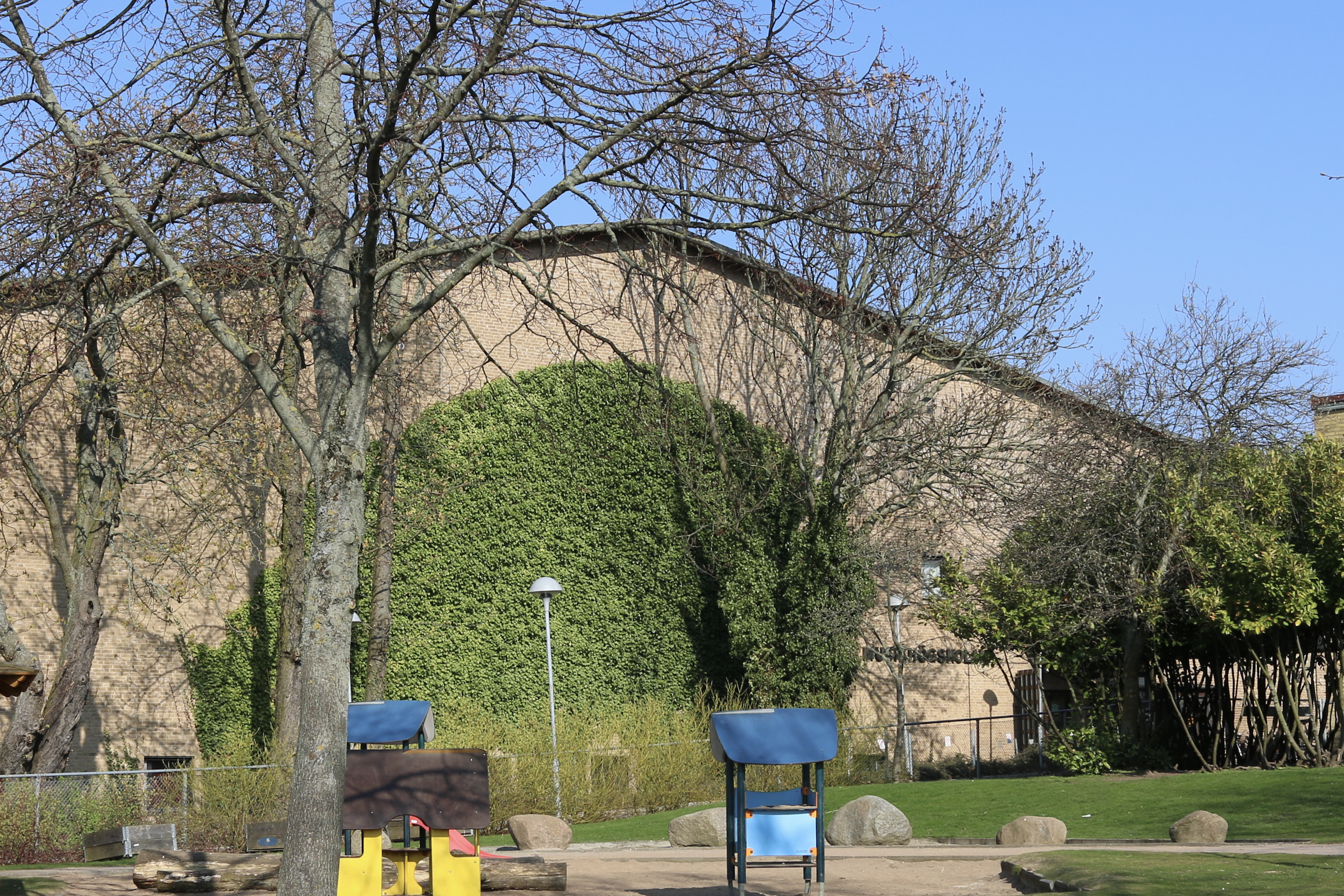
- Type: Public
- Established: 1907
- Affiliation: Lund University
- Location: Malmö, Sweden
- Website: www.mhm.lu.se

Malmö Academy of Music (Swedish: Musikhögskolan i Malmö) is a Swedish public college dedicated to education and research within the fields of music and music pedagogy. The school is located in Malmö in southern Sweden and belongs to the Faculty of Fine and Performing Arts at Lund University.

The school was founded in 1907 as a music conservatory. In 1971, it became public and changed its name to Malmö Academy of Music. Six years later, in 1977, the school became part of Lund University. In 2007, the Faculty of Fine and Performing Arts was established, which today includes Malmö Academy of Music, as well as Malmö Theatre Academy and Malmö Art Academy.

Malmö Academy of Music has about 35 educational programs at Bachelor's and Master's level as well as a large number of independent courses in jazz, church music, folk music, classical music and composition. The school also has one of Sweden's largest music teacher training programs.

Malmö Academy of Music collaborates with partner universities in several countries and is a member of international networks like Association Européenne des Conservatoires (AEC), International Society for Music Education (ISME), European Association for Music in Schools (EAS) and the Association of Nordic Music Academies (ANMA).
