= Mangelia gemmula =

Scientific classification
- Kingdom: Animalia
- Phylum: Mollusca
- Class: Gastropoda
- Subclass: Caenogastropoda
- Order: Neogastropoda
- Superfamily: Conoidea
- Family: Mangeliidae
- Genus: Mangelia
- Species: M. gemmula

Binomial name
- Mangelia gemmula Turton, 1932

Synonyms
- Mangilia gemmula Turton, 1932

Species of gastropod

Mangelia gemmula is a species of sea snail, a marine gastropod mollusk in the family Mangeliidae.

== Description ==
This species is similar to Mangelia tranquilla H. Barnard, 1958 but shows 12 axial plicae.

== Distribution ==
This marine species occurs off Port Alfred, South Africa.
