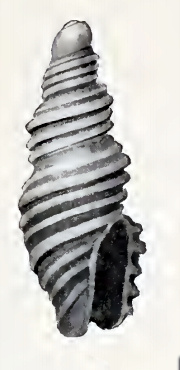
- Original image of a shell of Mangelia helga

Scientific classification
- Kingdom: Animalia
- Phylum: Mollusca
- Class: Gastropoda
- Subclass: Caenogastropoda
- Order: Neogastropoda
- Superfamily: Conoidea
- Family: Mangeliidae
- Genus: Mangelia
- Species: M. helga

Binomial name
- Mangelia helga P. Bartsch, 1915

Synonyms
- Mangilia helga P. Bartsch, 1915 (original combination); Mangelia (Mangiliella) helga (P. Bartsch, 1915) (original combination)

= Mangelia helga =

Species of gastropod

Mangelia helga is a species of sea snail, a marine gastropod mollusk in the family Mangeliidae.

== Description ==
The length of the shell attains 3 mm, its diameter 1 mm.

(Original description) The shell has a wax yellow color. The 1½ whorls of the protoconch are well rounded and apparently smooth. The subsequent whorls are strongly, tabulatedly shouldered. They are marked by strong, spiral cords, of which 3 occur between the angle of the shoulder and the suture on all the whorls. These are a little wider than the spaces that separate them. On the middle of the tabulated shoulder, a slender spiral cord begins on the first whorl, which increases in strength until it is about half as strong as those anterior to it on the body whorl. The sutures are strongly constricted. The periphery of the body whorl is marked by a cord fully as strong as those posterior to it. The base of the shell is moderately prolonged, slightly rounded, marked by three spiral cords which are almost as strong as those on the spire and of about equal spacing with them. The aperture is feebly channeled posteriorly, decidedly so anteriorly. The outer lip is rendered sinuous by the spiral cords. The inner lip and parietal wall are covered with a thin callus.

== Distribution ==
This marine species occurs off Port Alfred, South Africa.
