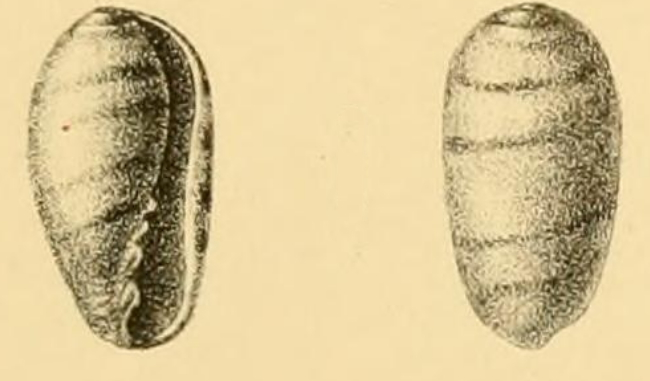
- Shell of Volvarina ingloria (holotype)

Scientific classification
- Kingdom: Animalia
- Phylum: Mollusca
- Class: Gastropoda
- Subclass: Caenogastropoda
- Order: Neogastropoda
- Family: Marginellidae
- Subfamily: Marginellinae
- Genus: Volvarina
- Species: V. ingloria

Binomial name
- Volvarina ingloria (E. A. Smith, 1910)

Synonyms
- Marginella ingloria E. A. Smith, 1910 (original combination)

= Volvarina ingloria =

Species of gastropod

Volvarina ingloria is a species of sea snail, a marine gastropod mollusk in the family Marginellidae, the margin snails.

== Description ==
The length of the shell attains 4.1 mm, its diameter 2 mm.

The small cylindrical shell is translucent. The short spire is obtuse. The shell consists of four whorls. The apical whorls are rotund and obtuse. The next two are slightly convex. The aperture is narrow but becomes somewhat wider at its base. The columella contains four plaits. The outer lip is white and slightly incrassate. Of the four dark red bands upon the body whorl the posterior and anterior are thicker than the other two. The termination of the anterior zone forms a conspicuous red spot at the end of the outer lip, and there is a similar spot upon the anterior columellar fold, which is the largest of the four, the others diminishing in size.

== Distribution ==
This marine species is endemic to South Africa and occurs off Port Alfred.
