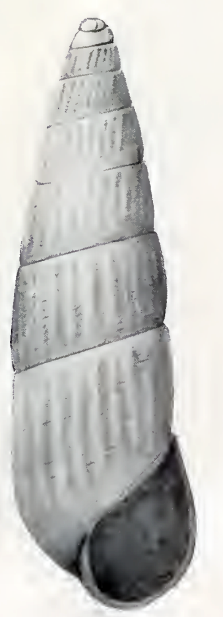
- Drawing of a shell of Turbonilla atossa

Scientific classification
- Kingdom: Animalia
- Phylum: Mollusca
- Class: Gastropoda
- Family: Pyramidellidae
- Genus: Turbonilla
- Species: T. apsa

Binomial name
- Turbonilla apsa Bartsch, 1915

Synonyms
- Turbonilla (Pyrgiscus) apsa Bartsch, 1915

= Turbonilla apsa =

Species of gastropod

Turbonilla apsa is a species of sea snail, a marine gastropod mollusk in the family Pyramidellidae, the pyrams and their allies.

== Description ==
The thin, semitranslucent, bluish white shell has an elongate-conic shape. Its length measures 4.9 mm. The whorls in the protoconch number at least two. They are rather large, depressed helicoid, well rounded, and about half immersed in the first of the succeeding turns. The eight whorls of the teleoconch are moderately well rounded. They are shouldered at the summit, which is slightly exserted, and marked by obsolete axial ribs which are best expressed on the early turns. Of these ribs about 18 are indicated upon the second, 22 upon the third and fourth, 28 upon the fifth, and 20 upon the sixth and penultimate turns. The intercostal spaces are scarcely visible, the ribs appearing a little more opaque than the spaces between them. In addition to the axial sculpture, the whorls are marked between the sutures by about eleven slender spiral striations which are of somewhat varying strength and spacing, the region immediately below the summit being free of spiral sculpture. The sutures are well impressed. The periphery is well rounded. The base of the shell is well rounded. It is marked by about 16 slender spiral lirations which are strongest near the periphery and grow weaker and closer spaced towards the umbilical chink, where they are very densely massed. The aperture is oval. The posterior angle is acute. The outer lip is thin. The inner lip is strongly curved, slightly reflected, and provided with a weak fold at its insertion. The parietal wall is covered with a thick callus which renders the peritreme almost complete.

== Distribution ==
This marine species occurs in the following locations: Port Alfred, South Africa
