= Education in Åland =

Ministry of Education and Culture
- Minister: Johan Ehn

National education budget (2013)
- Budget: €53.932 million (public); 4.7% of GDP

General details
- Primary languages: Swedish

Enrollment (2014)
- Total: 4,491
- Primary: 1,910
- Secondary: 2,091
- Post secondary: 490

The education system in Åland includes primary, secondary, and higher levels. Education is compulsory from age 6 to 15. This includes six years of primary school and three years of lower secondary school. After completing lower secondary school, students may continue to upper secondary education, provided by Ålands gymnasium. Higher education is offered at the Åland University of Applied Sciences.

Education in Åland is administered by the Ministry of Education and Culture (Swedish: Undervisnings- och kulturministeriet).

== Overview ==
Swedish is the main language of instruction in Åland. Between 2001 and 2014, the percentage of pupils in compulsory school who did not take any voluntary language courses rose from 16.8% to 31.2%.

In 2013, public spending on education was €53.932 million, or 4.7% of Åland’s GDP. In 2014, Åland employed 657 teachers across all education levels. The total number of enrolled students was 4,491.

== Structure of the education system ==
=== Primary education ===
Primary education (Swedish: lågstadiet) consists of six grades, typically covering ages 7 to 12. It is provided by the municipalities and is compulsory. In 2014, 1,910 students were enrolled in primary schools.

=== Lower secondary education ===
Lower secondary education (Swedish: högstadiet) covers grades 7–9, for students aged 13 to 15. It is also provided by the municipalities and is compulsory. In 2014, there were 945 students in lower secondary schools.

=== Upper secondary education ===
Upper secondary education is provided by Ålands gymnasium, which includes two main institutions:

- Ålands yrkesgymnasium – offers vocational training along with a high school diploma.
- Ålands lyceum – provides general academic education and eligibility for university and university of applied sciences studies.

In 2014, Ålands yrkesgymnasium enrolled 674 students and Ålands lyceum enrolled 472.

=== Other educational institutions ===
The Civic Institute (Swedish: Medborgarinstitutet) in Mariehamn provides informal adult education. It does not grant academic credits or formal qualifications.

The Ålands folkhögskola (Åland Folk High School) offers project-based courses, particularly in crafts and cultural subjects. In 2014, it had 56 students.

Both institutions also offer Swedish language courses for immigrants.

== Higher education ==
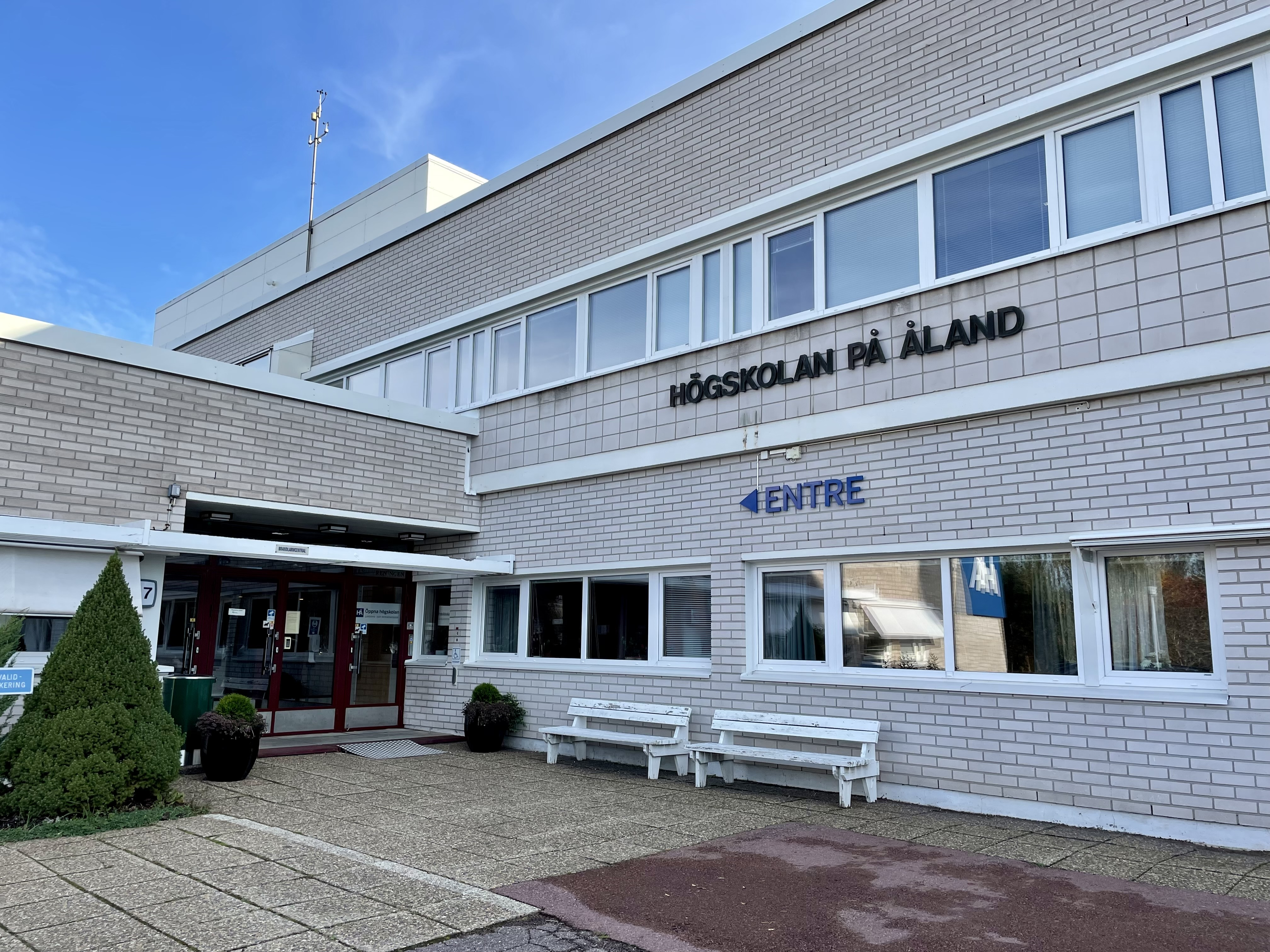
Åland University of Applied Sciences

The Åland University of Applied Sciences (Swedish: Högskolan på Åland) is based in Mariehamn. It was founded in 1997 and merged with the Åland Open University on January 1, 2003.

Most courses are taught in Swedish, although some are offered in English. In 2014, the university had 490 students.

== Maritime education ==
In 2020, Åland established the Alandica Shipping Academy. It offers basic and refresher training for seafarers, as well as maritime education at both upper secondary and higher education levels.
