= Maritime Institute Willem Barentsz =

Educational institution in the Netherlands

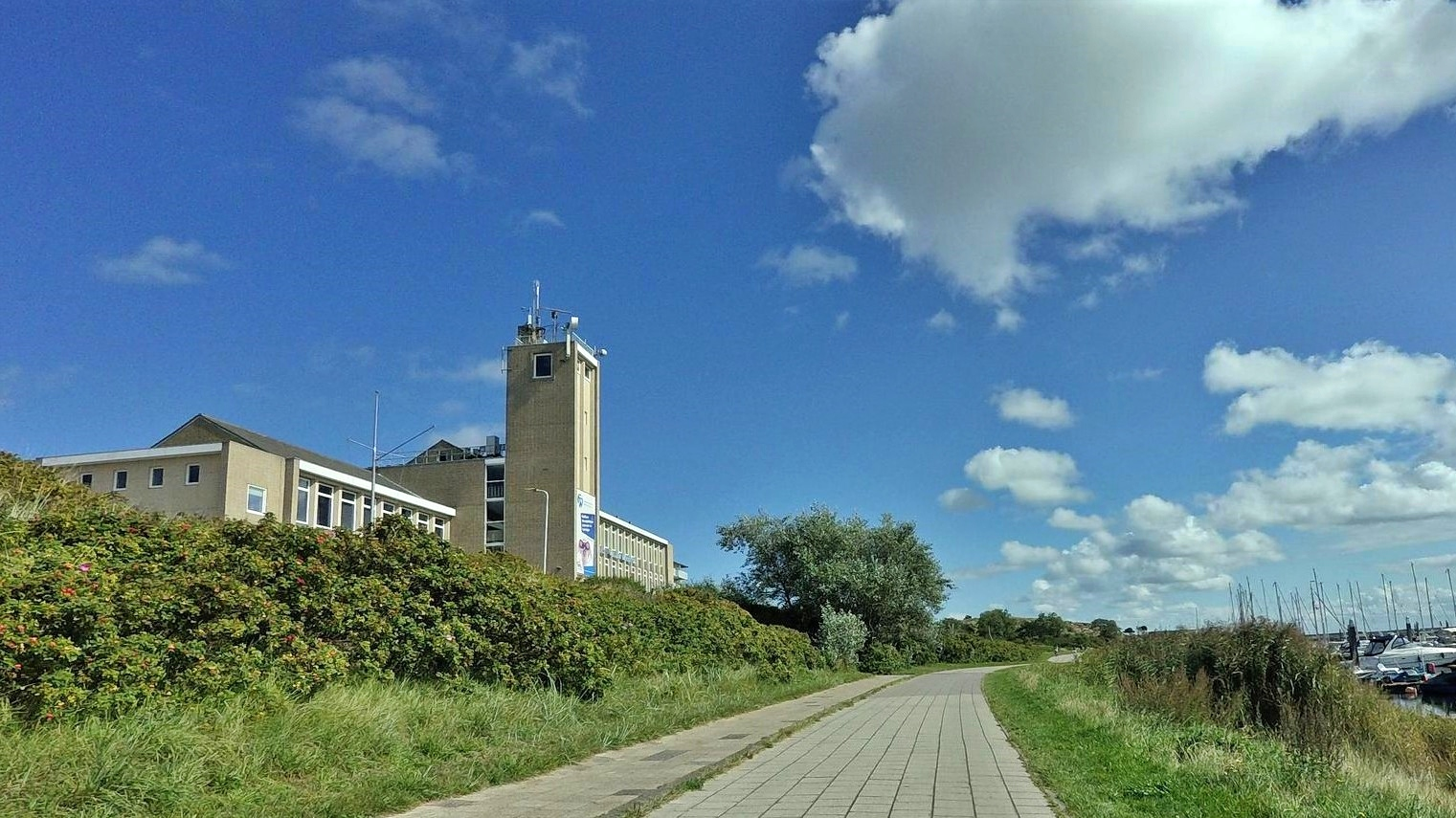
- Motto: Vigilate Audacter
- Type: University of Applied Sciences
- Established: 1875
- Students: 373
- Location: Terschelling, Netherlands; 53°21′57″N 5°13′20″E
- Colours: Blue
- Website: www.nhlstenden.com/miwb

Maritime Institute Willem Barentsz (MIWB, Dutch: Maritiem Instituut Willem Barentsz) is an educational institution located on Terschelling, one of the West Frisian Islands in the northern part of the Netherlands. The maritime academy was founded in 1875 and today it is part of NHL Stenden University of Applied Sciences. MIWB is named after navigator and explorer Willem Barentsz, who was born on the island. MIWB is a member of IASST.

== Education ==
MIWB offers the bachelors Maritiem officier and Ocean Technology on the island and additionally provides a bachelor programme in Leeuwarden (Maritieme techniek), all according hbo-level. Maritiem officier focusses both on navigational and engineering operations, while Ocean Technology mainly teaches cartography/hydrography. Since 2015, MIWB has been offering master programme Master of Marine Shipping Innovations to seafarers with some experience. In collaboration with MSTC the institute also features a simulation training center and maritime courses for both (external) maritime students and the professional field. For training purposes, former professional MV Octans had been available to students since 2003. A few months after the sale by the institute, this vessel sank during Storm Eunice.

== Locations ==
Most activities take place in the institutes main building, which was opened in 1966 and re-opened after a modernisation in 2019. Besides, the MIWB also has access to the nearby Nautisch Kwartier and MSTC.

First and second year students normally reside in the newly constructed campus, consisting of four square buildings for housing (with four floors each). Students also have access to a public space with a bar, sports area and rooms for student association WBS.

== WBS ==
The Hogere Zeevaartschoolvereniging Willem Barentsz, in short WBS, has been serving as a social student association for decades. Beside the weekly baravond, the annual Voorjaarsbal is organised for students and their relatives. Many sports and activities have their own department within the WBS, like rowing, sailing and fishing. For upcoming first year students, the association also organizes an intensive introduction week for upcoming freshmen (known as biggen).
