= Marginella rubrocincta =

Scientific classification
- Kingdom: Animalia
- Phylum: Mollusca
- Class: Gastropoda
- Subclass: Caenogastropoda
- Order: Neogastropoda
- Family: Marginellidae
- Genus: Marginella
- Species: M. rubrocincta

Binomial name
- Marginella rubrocincta Turton, 1932

Species of gastropod

Marginella rubrocincta is a species of sea snail, a marine gastropod mollusk in the family Marginellidae, the margin snails.

== Distribution ==
This marine species occurs off Port Alfred, South Africa.
