= Turbonilla decora =

Scientific classification
- Kingdom: Animalia
- Phylum: Mollusca
- Class: Gastropoda
- Family: Pyramidellidae
- Genus: Turbonilla
- Species: T. decora

Binomial name
- Turbonilla decora E. A. Smith, 1904

Synonyms
- Turbonilla (Mormula) decora Smith, 1904

Species of gastropod

Turbonilla decora is a species of sea snail, a marine gastropod mollusk in the family Pyramidellidae, the pyrams and their allies.

== Distribution ==
The type specimen of this marine species was found off Port Alfred, South Africa.
