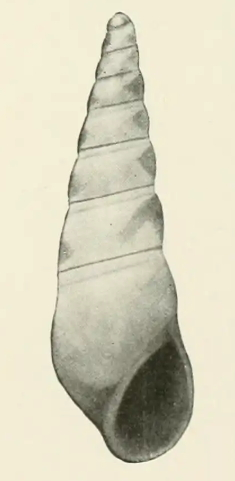
- Shell of Melanella thalia (holotype)

Scientific classification
- Kingdom: Animalia
- Phylum: Mollusca
- Class: Gastropoda
- Subclass: Caenogastropoda
- Order: Littorinimorpha
- Family: Eulimidae
- Genus: Melanella
- Species: M. thalia

Binomial name
- Melanella thalia (Bartsch, 1915)

Synonyms
- Eulima balteata W. H. Turton, 1932 (nvalid: junior primary homonym of Eulima balteata Preston, 1908)

= Melanella thalia =

Species of gastropod

Melanella thalia is a species of sea snail, a marine gastropod mollusk in the family Eulimidae. The species is one of many species known to exist within the genus, Melanella.

== Description ==
The length of the shell attains 3.2 mm, its diameter 1.1 mm.

(Original description) The small shell is elongate-conical, and very slightly falcate. It has a bluish-white, translucent appearance. The whorls are very gently rounded and appressed at the summit. Because the preceding whorl shines through the shell at this point, the shell appears to possess a double suture. The suture itself is scarcely discernible. The periphery of the body whorl is slightly inflated, while the base is moderately long and well rounded. The entire surface is marked by exceedingly fine lines of growth and by an occasional, inconspicuous varix.

The aperture is oval, with an acute posterior angle. The outer lip is clavate. The inner lip is very oblique, slender, strongly curved, and decidedly reflected; it remains free from the body whorl. The parietal wall is covered by a moderately thick callus.

== Distribution ==
This marine species occurs off Port Alfred, South Africa.
