= Åland Vocational School =

Vocational school in Åland, Finland

- Åland Vocational School
- Ålands yrkesgymnasium
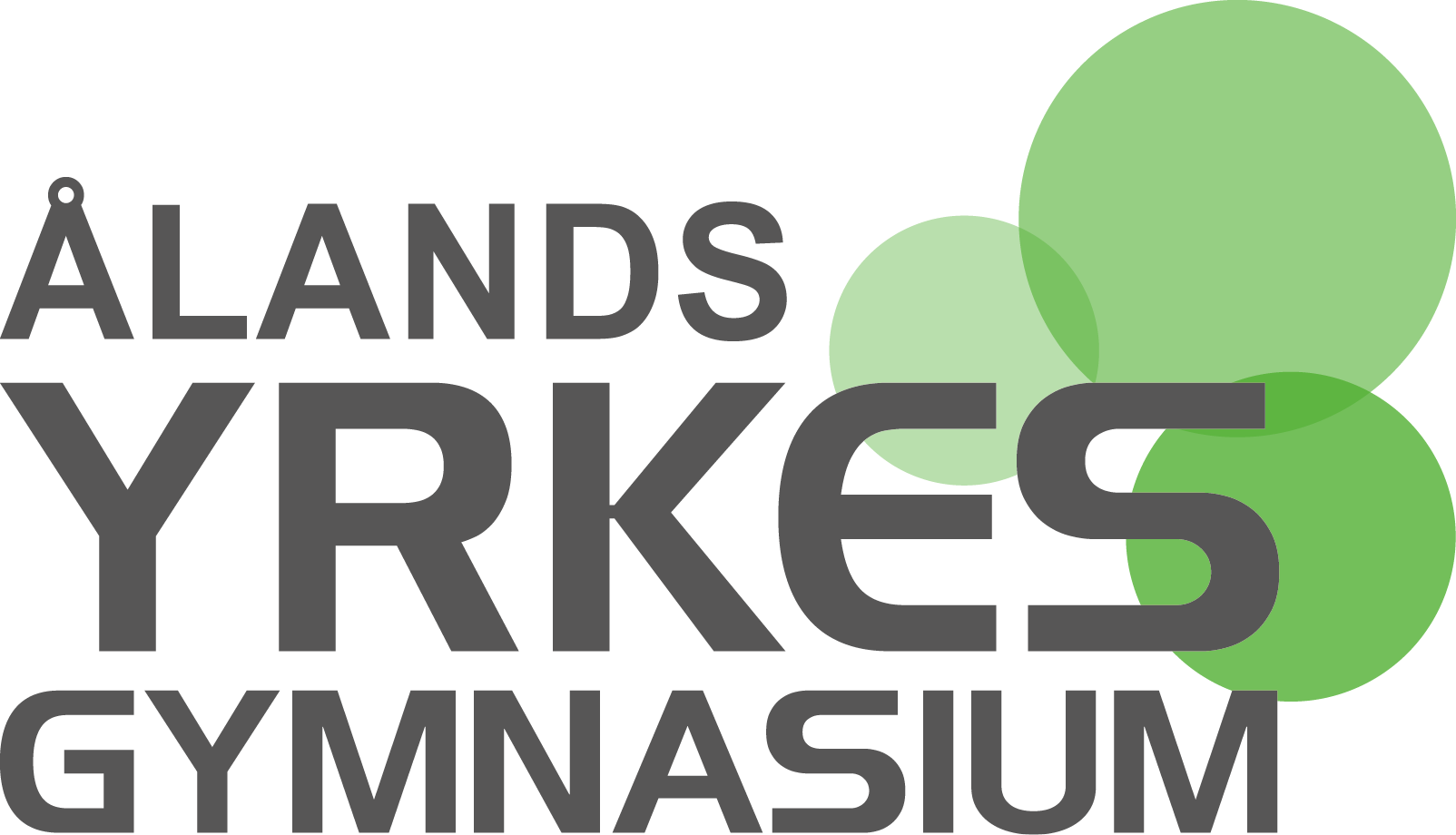

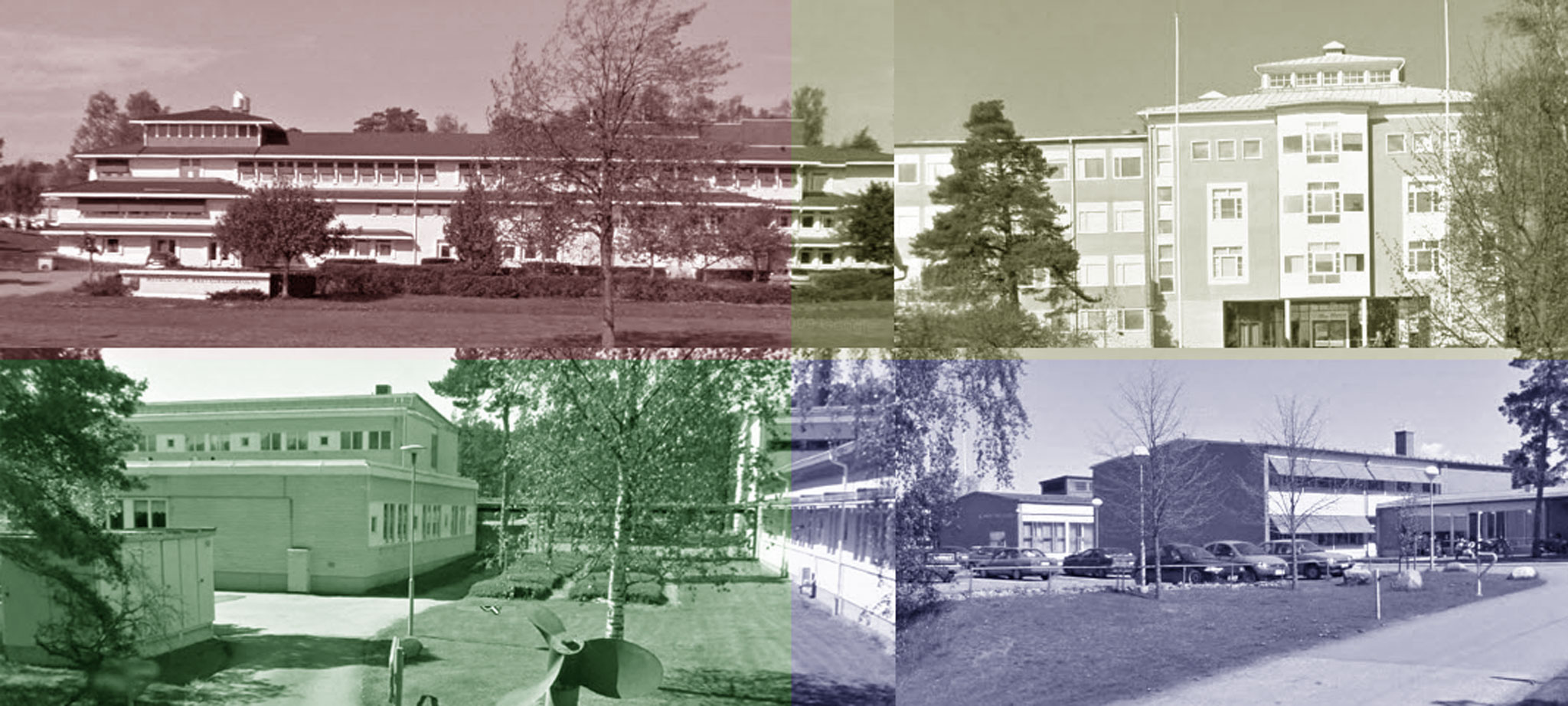
- School buildings of Ålands yrkesgymnasium
- Formation: 2011
- Location: Mariehamn, Åland, Finland
- Official language: Swedish
- Website: www.gymnasium.ax/alands-yrkesgymnasium

Åland Vocational School (Ålands yrkesgymnasium) is a Swedish-language vocational school in Mariehamn, the capital of Åland, an autonomous region of Finland. The school is part of Ålands gymnasium, along with Ålands lyceum.

Since 2018, Gitte Holmström has served as principal. Her term runs until 2025.

The school was founded on 1 August 2011 through the merger of several vocational schools in Åland: Ålands hotell- och restaurangskola, Ålands handelsläroverk, Ålands sjömansskola, Ålands vårdinstitut, and Ålands yrkesskola.

As of 2022, the school offers 18 vocational programs.

The school’s maritime program, previously known as Ålands sjömansskola, is part of the Alandica Shipping Academy, which coordinates maritime training in Åland. In 2021, Wärtsilä donated a 9L20 engine to the school for use in maritime training.

== See also ==
- Education in Åland
