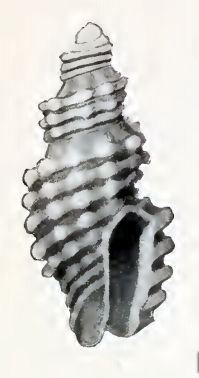
- Original image of a shell of Mangelia nisga

Scientific classification
- Kingdom: Animalia
- Phylum: Mollusca
- Class: Gastropoda
- Subclass: Caenogastropoda
- Order: Neogastropoda
- Superfamily: Conoidea
- Family: Mangeliidae
- Genus: Mangelia
- Species: M. nisga

Binomial name
- Mangelia nisga P. Bartsch, 1915

Synonyms
- Mangilia nisga P. Bartsch, 1915 (original combination)

= Mangelia nisga =

Species of gastropod

Mangelia nisga is a species of sea snail, a marine gastropod mollusk in the family Mangeliidae.

== Description ==
The length of the shell attains 3.1 mm, its diameter 1.5 mm.

(Original description) The small shell is yellowish white. The 1½ whorls in the protoconch are small, smooth, forming a very small, well-rounded. The apex is white. The subsequent whorls show a very strong sloping shoulder, which is bounded anteriorly by a strong tuberculated spiral cord. In addition to this cord, the whorls are marked by three additional cords, which decrease in strength successively from the strong cord at the shoulder, to the suture. The space between the strong shoulder and the summit of the shell is marked by a strong spiral thread. The base of the body whorl is marked by a peripheral cord, about as strong as the one adjacent to it posteriorly and two others as strong as this, having the same spacing as those on the spire. The columella is provided with four cords, of which the fourth, which marks the anterior limit of the columella, is as strong as the first, while the two intermediate ones are less strongly developed. In addition to the spiral sculpture, the whorls are marked with rounded, low, quite regularly spaced, axial ribs, of which 10 occur upon the first and second, and 14 upon the body whorl. These ribs render the spiral cords tuberculated at their junction with them. In addition, to these strong axial ribs, the entire surface of the shell, between the sutures ami the anterior half of the base, is marked by numerous, quite regular, closely spaced, axial threads, which are best shown in the spaces between the spiral cords and on the tabulated summit of the whorls. The aperture is rather large, scarcely channeled posteriorly. The outer lip is very thick, rendered denticulate on the outside by the spiral cords. The inner lip and the parietal wall are glazed with a thin callus.

== Distribution ==
This marine species occurs off Port Alfred, South Africa.
