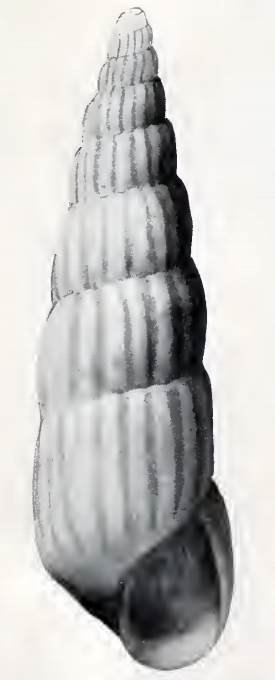
- Drawing of a shell of Turbonilla cifara

Scientific classification
- Kingdom: Animalia
- Phylum: Mollusca
- Class: Gastropoda
- Family: Pyramidellidae
- Genus: Turbonilla
- Species: T. cifara

Binomial name
- Turbonilla cifara Bartsch, 1915

Synonyms
- Turbonilla (Mormula) cifara Bartsch, 1915

= Turbonilla cifara =

Species of gastropod

Turbonilla cifara is a species of sea snail, a marine gastropod mollusk in the family Pyramidellidae, the pyrams and their allies.

== Description ==
The bluish-white shell is large and robust and has an elongate-conic shape. Its length measures 15 mm. The whorls of the protoconch are decollated. The nine whorls of the teleoconch are slightly rounded, roundly shouldered at the summit and weakly contracted at the suture. They are marked by rather strong, somewhat irregular, slightly retractive, axial ribs and an occasional varix, marking the fusion of a number of ribs. The varices are irregularly disposed. Of the axial ribs, 22 occur upon the first and second, and 20 upon all the remaining turns but the penultimate, which has 22. On this turn they are rather irregularly disposed and less strongly developed. In addition to the axial ribs the whorls are crossed by weakly incised spiral lines, which are of somewhat varying strength. There are probably 50 of these between the sutures. These lines and the feeble lines of growth between the ribs lend the whorls a cloth-like texture. The sutures are well impressed. The periphery of the body whorl is feebly angulated. The base of the shell is short, and moderately rounded. It is marked by the continuation of the axial ribs and spiral lirations, the latter of varying strength. The aperture is irregularly oval. The posterior angle is obtuse. The outer lip$ is moderately thin, showing the external sculpture within. The inner lip is very oblique, almost straight, reflected over and appressed to the body whorl, except at the extreme anterior tip, which is free. The columella is provided with a feeble fold at its insertion. The parietal wall is glazed with a thin callus.

== Distribution ==
This marine species occurs in the following locations: Port Alfred, South Africa
