= Mangelia kowiensis =

Scientific classification
- Kingdom: Animalia
- Phylum: Mollusca
- Class: Gastropoda
- Subclass: Caenogastropoda
- Order: Neogastropoda
- Superfamily: Conoidea
- Family: Mangeliidae
- Genus: Mangelia
- Species: M. kowiensis

Binomial name
- Mangelia kowiensis Turton, 1932

Synonyms
- Mangilia kowiensis Turton, 1932

Species of gastropod

Mangelia kowiensis is a species of sea snail, a marine gastropod mollusk in the family Mangeliidae.

== Description ==
The length of the shell attains 3.3 mm, its diameter is 1.5 mm.

== Distribution ==
This marine species occurs off Port Alfred, South Africa.
