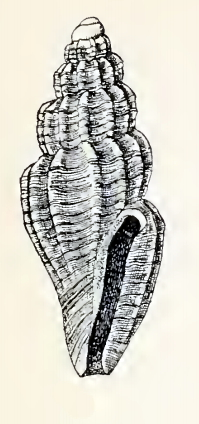
- Original image of a shell of Mangelia dina

Scientific classification
- Kingdom: Animalia
- Phylum: Mollusca
- Class: Gastropoda
- Subclass: Caenogastropoda
- Order: Neogastropoda
- Superfamily: Conoidea
- Family: Mangeliidae
- Genus: Mangelia
- Species: M. dina

Binomial name
- Mangelia dina P. Bartsch, 1915

Synonyms
- Mangilia dina P. Bartsch, 1915 (original combination)

= Mangelia dina =

Species of gastropod

Mangelia dina is a species of sea snail, a marine gastropod mollusk in the family Mangeliidae.

== Description ==
The length of the shell attains 6 mm, its diameter 2.4 mm.

(Original description) The milk white shell contains 6 whorls. The 2½ whorls of the protoconch are dextral, forming a low apex. The first whorl is small and smooth, the second much larger, marked by very slender riblets and fine spiral lirations which increase in strength with the growth of the whorls. The subsequent whorls are very strongly shouldered at about one third of the distance between the sutures anterior to the summit. They are marked by strong, somewhat protractive axial ribs, of which 12 occur upon all but the penultimate whorl. Upon this there are 14. Intercostal spaces are about three times as wide as the ribs. In addition to the axial sculpture the whorls are marked by spiral lirations which are of two strengths. Four of the stronger cross the whorls between the periphery and the shoulder. Of these one is immediately above the suture and one at the angle of the shoulder, the other two divide the space between them into three unequal areas. The space between the peripheral and second strong liration is crossed by four slender subequal spiral threads; that between the second and third also by four, that between the third and fourth by five, of which the middle one is a little stronger than the rest. The space between the shoulder and the summit of the whorls is marked by about 20 slender, equal and equally spaced, spiral threads. The sutures are strongly marked. The periphery of the body whorl is well rounded. The base of the shell is attenuated, marked by strong and fine lirations like the spire, those on the columellar portion being stronger than the rest. There are twelve strong threads having a somewhat variable number of finer threads between them. The entire surface of spire and base is also marked by fine lines of growth which give a pitted appearance to the spaces between the fine spiral fines in the intercostal spaces. All the spirals cross the axial ribs and the coarser ones render their junctions with the ribs slightly nodulose. The aperture is of irregular shape. The outer lip is scythe-shaped, the border of the deep-rounded notch which is immediately below the summit representing the handle, the flattened surface of the strongly in-bent outer lip forming the blade; the surface of the latter is finely, spirally striated. The columellar wall is covered by a thin callus which extends upon the parietal wall.

== Distribution ==
This marine species occurs off Port Alfred, South Africa.
