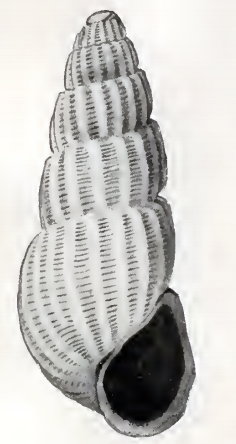
- Drawing of a shell of Turbonilla atossa

Scientific classification
- Kingdom: Animalia
- Phylum: Mollusca
- Class: Gastropoda
- Family: Pyramidellidae
- Genus: Turbonilla
- Species: T. atossa

Binomial name
- Turbonilla atossa Bartsch, 1915

Synonyms
- Turbonilla (Pyrgiscus) angea Bartsch, 1915

= Turbonilla atossa =

Species of gastropod

Turbonilla atossa is a species of sea snail, a marine gastropod mollusk in the family Pyramidellidae, the pyrams and their allies.

== Description ==
The bluish-white shell has an elongate-conic shape. Its length measures 4.4 mm. The whorls in protoconch number more than two. They are smooth, the early portion obliquely immersed in the later. The six whorls of the teleoconch are strongly shouldered at the summit. They are marked by well-rounded, somewhat retractive, strong, axial ribs, of which 16 occur upon the first, 18 upon the second to fourth, and 20 upon the penultimate turn. These ribs extend strongly from the summit of the whorls to the umbilical chink. The intercostal spaces are about twice as broad as the ribs. They are crossed by fine, incised, spiral fines, of which 7 occur between the shoulder at the summit and the suture on the first and second, 9 upon the third, 15 upon the fourth and the penultimate turn. The spaces separating these spiral striations are about twice as wide as the striations. The sutures are strongly constricted. The periphery of the body whorl is somewhat inflated, and well rounded. The base of the shell is moderately long, well rounded, and narrowly umbilicated. It is marked by the strong continuations of the axial ribs and fine spiral striations, which become a little closer spaced on the anterior portion than at the periphery. The aperture is pear-shaped. The posterior angle is obtuse. The outer lip is somewhat sinuous, thick within, and sloping to a thin edge. The columella is slender, curved, reflected, and provided with an oblique fold at its insertion. The parietal wall is covered with a thick callus which gives the peristome a complete aspect.

== Distribution ==
This marine species occurs in the following locations: Port Alfred, South Africa
