= Alvania inflata =

Scientific classification
- Kingdom: Animalia
- Phylum: Mollusca
- Class: Gastropoda
- Subclass: Caenogastropoda
- Order: Littorinimorpha
- Family: Rissoidae
- Genus: Alvania
- Species: A. inflata

Binomial name
- Alvania inflata W. H. Turton, 1932

Species of gastropod

Alvania inflata is a species of minute sea snail, a marine gastropod mollusk or micromollusk in the family Rissoidae.

== Distribution ==
This species occurs off Port Alfred, South Africa.
