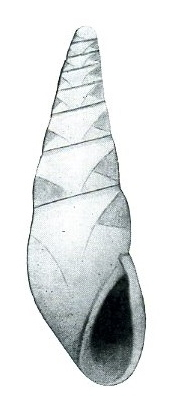
- Original drawing of a shell of Melanella alfredensis

Scientific classification
- Kingdom: Animalia
- Phylum: Mollusca
- Class: Gastropoda
- Subclass: Caenogastropoda
- Order: Littorinimorpha
- Family: Eulimidae
- Genus: Melanella
- Species: M. alfredensis

Binomial name
- Melanella alfredensis Bartsch, 1915

= Melanella alfredensis =

Species of gastropod

Melanella alfredensis is a species of sea snail, a marine gastropod mollusk in the family Eulimidae. The species is one of many species known to exist within the genus, Melanella.

== Description ==
The length of the shell attains 4 mm, its diameter 1.2 mm.

(Original description) The small shell is elongate-conical, and slightly falcate. It has an almost transparent, bluish-white appearance. The whorls are slightly rounded and appressed at the summit, allowing the preceding whorl to show through and giving the shell the appearance of having a double suture. The suture is only faintly impressed. The periphery is well rounded, while the base is attenuated and likewise evenly rounded. The entire surface is polished and bears exceedingly fine incremental lines, together with an occasional varix arranged irregularly. The aperture is ovate; the outer lip is somewhat clavate, and the inner lip is appressed and gently curved. The parietal wall glazed with a thin callus.

== Distribution ==
This marine species occurs off Port Alfred, South Africa.
