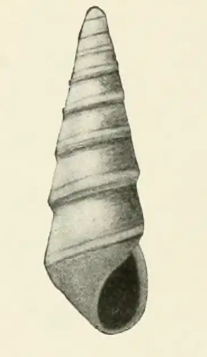
- Shell of Melanella magnifica (holotype)

Scientific classification
- Kingdom: Animalia
- Phylum: Mollusca
- Class: Gastropoda
- Subclass: Caenogastropoda
- Order: Littorinimorpha
- Family: Eulimidae
- Genus: Melanella
- Species: M. magnifica

Binomial name
- Melanella magnifica (Bartsch, 1915)

Synonyms
- Subeulima magnifica Bartsch, 1915 ·

= Melanella magnifica =

Species of gastropod

Melanella magnifica is a species of sea snail, a marine gastropod mollusk in the family Eulimidae. The species is one of many species known to exist within the genus, Melanella.

== Description ==
The length of the shell attains 5 mm, its diameter 1.5 mm.

(Original description) The elongate-conical shell is vitreous, and semitranslucent. The whorls in the protoconch are well rounded and scarcely differentiated from the succeeding whorls. The postnuclear whorls are almost flattened and bear a strong spiral cord at the periphery. The summit of each succeeding whorl lies considerably anterior to this cord, giving the whorls a decidedly overhanging appearance. In addition to this spiral sculpture, the whorls bear ill-defined, irregularly distributed varices. The sutures are rendered conspicuous by the prominent peripheral keel.

The base of the body whorl is well rounded, somewhat produced, and smooth. The aperture is oval, with an acute posterior angle. The outer lip is moderately thick, whereas the inner lip is strongly curved and appressed to the base. The parietal wall is covered by a thick callus, which completes the peritreme (rim or edge surrounding the aperture).

== Distribution ==
This marine species occurs off Port Alfred, South Africa.
