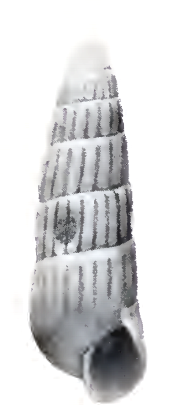
- Drawing of a shell of Turbonilla angea

Scientific classification
- Kingdom: Animalia
- Phylum: Mollusca
- Class: Gastropoda
- Family: Pyramidellidae
- Genus: Turbonilla
- Species: T. angea

Binomial name
- Turbonilla angea Bartsch, 1915

Synonyms
- Turbonilla (Pyrgolampros) angea Bartsch, 1915

= Turbonilla angea =

Species of gastropod

Turbonilla angea is a species of sea snail, a marine gastropod mollusk in the family Pyramidellidae, the pyrams and their allies.

== Description ==
The brownish yellow shell has an elongate-conic shape. Its length measures 5 mm. (The whorls of the protoconch are decollated). The 7½ whorls of the teleoconch are very slightly rounded, and feebly shouldered at the summit. They are marked by rather broad, low, somewhat protractive axial ribs, of which 16 occur upon the second, 18 upon the third to fifth; 20 upon the sixth; and 22 upon the penultimate turn. These ribs are about double the width of the spaces that separate them. In addition to the ribs, the whorls are marked by exceedingly fine, microscopic, spiral striations. The periphery of the body whorl is well rounded. The base of the shell is moderately long, and well rounded. It is crossed by the very feeble continuations of the axial ribs and exceedingly fine, spiral striations. The aperture is oval. The posterior angle is acute. The outer lip is thin. The inner lip is very short, slightly revolute and appressed. It is provided with a weak fold at its insertion. The parietal wall is glazed with a thin callus.

== Distribution ==
This marine species occurs in the following locations: Port Alfred, South Africa
