= Mangelia perminima =

Scientific classification
- Kingdom: Animalia
- Phylum: Mollusca
- Class: Gastropoda
- Subclass: Caenogastropoda
- Order: Neogastropoda
- Superfamily: Conoidea
- Family: Mangeliidae
- Genus: Mangelia
- Species: M. perminima

Binomial name
- Mangelia perminima Turton, 1932

Synonyms
- Mangilia perminima Turton, 1932

Species of gastropod

Mangelia perminima is a species of sea snail, a marine gastropod mollusk in the family Mangeliidae.

== Description ==
This gold coloured/colored shell is usually around 2.6 mm long.

== Distribution ==
This marine species occurs off Port Alfred and Gordons Bay, South Africa.
