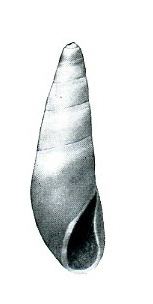
- Shell of Melanella cifara (holotype)

Scientific classification
- Kingdom: Animalia
- Phylum: Mollusca
- Class: Gastropoda
- Subclass: Caenogastropoda
- Order: Littorinimorpha
- Family: Eulimidae
- Genus: Melanella
- Species: M. cifara

Binomial name
- Melanella cifara Bartsch, 1915

Synonyms
- Eulima tincta Bartsch, 1915

= Melanella cifara =

Species of gastropod

Melanella cifara is a species of sea snail, a marine gastropod mollusk in the family Eulimidae. The species is one of many species known to exist within the genus, Melanella.

== Description ==
The length of the shell attains 2.1 mm, its diameter 0.6 mm.

(Original description) The minute shell is acicular, and semitranslucent, with a flesh-coloured ground marked by brown variegation. The two whorls in the protoconch are well rounded, translucent, and pale brown. The postnuclear whorls are very slightly rounded and almost transparent. They are variegated with translucent, pale-brown areas and opaque, flesh-coloured spots; they are appressed at the summit, polished, and apparently lack varices or other varicial markings. The suture is scarcely discernible. The inner posterior termination of each whorl is visible through the substance of the shell, giving the impression of a second suture. The periphery is well rounded, and the base is attenuated and evenly rounded.

The aperture is elongate-oval, with an acute posterior angle. The outer lip projects forward medially, forming a claw-like element. The inner lip is almost straight and oblique, and is reflected over and appressed to the body whorl throughout its entire length. The parietal wall is covered by a moderately thick, glazed callus.

== Distribution ==
This marine species occurs off Port Alfred, South Africa.
