= Alvania subventricosa =

Scientific classification
- Kingdom: Animalia
- Phylum: Mollusca
- Class: Gastropoda
- Subclass: Caenogastropoda
- Order: Littorinimorpha
- Superfamily: Rissooidea
- Family: Rissoidae
- Genus: Alvania
- Species: A. subventricosa

Binomial name
- Alvania subventricosa W. H. Turton, 1932

Species of gastropod

Alvania subventricosa is a species of minute sea snail, a marine gastropod mollusk or micromollusk in the family Rissoidae.

== Distribution ==
This marine species occurs off Port Alfred, South Africa.
