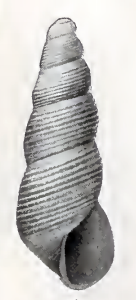
- Drawing of a shell of Turbonilla carifa

Scientific classification
- Kingdom: Animalia
- Phylum: Mollusca
- Class: Gastropoda
- Family: Pyramidellidae
- Genus: Turbonilla
- Species: T. carifa

Binomial name
- Turbonilla carifa Bartsch, 1915

Synonyms
- Turbonilla (Careliopsis) angea Bartsch, 1915

= Turbonilla carifa =

Species of gastropod

Turbonilla carifa is a species of sea snail, a marine gastropod mollusk in the family Pyramidellidae, the pyrams and their allies.

== Description ==
The semitranslucent, bluish-white shell is small and has an elongate-conic shape. Its length measures 2.1 mm. The whorls of the protoconch number at least two. They are large and smooth. They form a depressed helicoid spire, which is a little more than half obliquely immersed in the first of the succeeding turns. The five whorls of the teleoconch are well rounded, and feebly shouldered at the summit. They are marked by quite regular, equal and equally spaced, fine spiral lirations, of which 9 occur upon the first and second, 10 upon the third, and 11 upon the penultimate turn between the sutures. The suture is decidedly constricted. The periphery of the body whorl is well rounded. The base of the shell is moderately long, and very narrowly umbilicated. It is a little less strongly rounded than the space between the sutures. It is marked by about 11 spiral lirations of about the same strength and spacing as those occurring on the spire. In addition to the spiral sculpture, the whorls are marked by exceedingly fine, decidedly retractively slanting lines of growth. The oval aperture is moderately large. The posterior angle is obtuse. The outer lip is thin, showing the external sculpture within. The inner lip is strongly curved, very slender, reflected over and attached to the body whorl, except the extreme anterior portion, which is free. The parietal wall is covered by a thick callus.

== Distribution ==
This marine species occurs in the following locations: Port Alfred, South Africa
