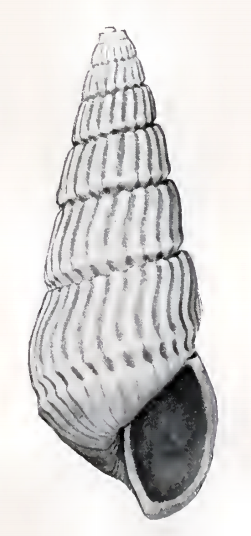
- Drawing of a shell of Turbonilla adaba

Scientific classification
- Kingdom: Animalia
- Phylum: Mollusca
- Class: Gastropoda
- Family: Pyramidellidae
- Genus: Turbonilla
- Species: T. adaba

Binomial name
- Turbonilla adaba Bartsch, 1915

Synonyms
- Turbonilla (Pselliogyra) adaba Bartsch, 1915

= Turbonilla adaba =

Species of gastropod

Turbonilla adaba is a species of sea snail, a marine gastropod mollusk in the family Pyramidellidae, the pyrams and their allies.

== Description ==
The white shell has a broadly elongate-conic shape. Its length measures 5 mm. The whorls of the protoconch are well rounded, and smooth. They are obliquely immersed in the first of the succeeding turns, above which the tilted edge of the last volution only projects. The eight whorls of the teleoconch are almost flattened. They are very strongly, tabulatedly shouldered at the summit. They are crossed by strong, very regular, somewhat sinuous, slightly protractive, axial ribs, of which 20 occur upon the second and third, 22 upon the fourth and fifth, 24 upon the sixth, and 28 upon the penultimate turn. These ribs extend prominently from the shoulder, which they render crenulated, to the periphery of the turn. The intercostal spaces are a little wider than the rib. A spiral cord in the intercostal is present about one-fifth of the space between the sutures posterior to the suture, which is equal in strength to the spiral cord at the periphery. The sulcus between the two spiral cords and between the anterior cord and the periphery of the body whorl are marked by the continuations of the axial ribs. The sutures are strongly channeled. The periphery of the body whorl is rendered decidedly angulated by the spiral cord. The base of the shell is rather long, well rounded, and narrowly umbilicated. The entire surface is marked by slender spiral striations. The aperture is broadly oval. The outer lip is moderately thick. The inner lip is somewhat curved and slightly revolute. The columella is provided with an oblique fold at its insertion. The parietal wall is glazed with a thick callus.

== Distribution ==
This marine species occurs in the following locations: Port Alfred, South Africa
