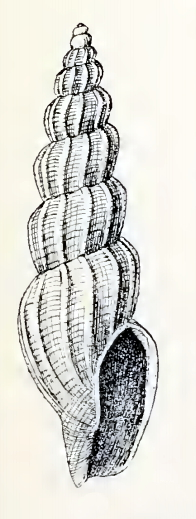
- Original image of a shell of Mangelia eucosmia

Scientific classification
- Kingdom: Animalia
- Phylum: Mollusca
- Class: Gastropoda
- Subclass: Caenogastropoda
- Order: Neogastropoda
- Superfamily: Conoidea
- Family: Mangeliidae
- Genus: Mangelia
- Species: M. eucosmia

Binomial name
- Mangelia eucosmia P. Bartsch, 1915

Synonyms
- Mangilia eucosmia P. Bartsch, 1915 (original combination); Mangilia rufanensis Turton, W.H., 1932

= Mangelia eucosmia =

Species of gastropod

Mangelia eucosmia is a species of sea snail, a marine gastropod mollusk in the family Mangeliidae.

This is a taxon inquirendum.

== Description ==
The length of the shell attains 12.4 mm, its diameter 4 mm.

(Original description) The slender shell has an elongate-conic shape. It is white with narrow brown bands. The type specimen contains 9 whorls forming an elevated spire. The protoconch consists of 2½ whorls, dextral, strongly rounded and smooth, The subsequent whorls show a strong shoulder one-third of the distance between the sutures anterior to the summit, the rest well rounded. They are marked by strong, narrow, sinuous, slightly protractive, axial ribs, of which 10 occur upon the first, 12 upon the second and third, 14 upon the fourth and fifth, and 16 upon the penultimate whorl. The intercostal spaces are about three times as wide as the ribs. The spiral sculpture consists of moderately broad, low, flattened spiral lirations, separated by channels a little less in width than the lirations. These lirations grow gradually wider from the summit to the periphery. There are 14 of them between the sutures on the penultimate whorl. The base of the shell is attenuated, marked by the continuations of the axial ribs and about 14 spiral lirations. Those of the outer half where the ribs are absent are much stronger than the rest. The aperture is almost oval, decidedly expanded at the posterior angle, where the outer lip is somewhat reflected by the shallow channel. The middle of the outer lip is slightly inbent and thin. The columella is sinuous and somewhat twisted. It is covered by a thin callus which extends up on the parietal wall.

== Distribution ==
This marine species occurs off Port Alfred, South Africa.
