= Philbertia alfredensis =

Scientific classification
- Kingdom: Animalia
- Phylum: Mollusca
- Class: Gastropoda
- Subclass: Caenogastropoda
- Order: Neogastropoda
- Superfamily: Conoidea
- Family: Raphitomidae
- Genus: Philbertia
- Species: P. alfredensis

Binomial name
- Philbertia alfredensis (Turton W. H., 1932)

Synonyms
- Bellardiella alfredensis Turton W. H., 1932

Species of gastropod

Philbertia alfredensis is a species of sea snail, a marine gastropod mollusk in the family Raphitomidae.

This is a taxon inquirendum.

== Description ==
This strange creature looks much like a sea shell or spire and ranges from colors of white to black with intricate and interesting patterns.

== Distribution ==
This marine species has been found at Port Alfred, South Africa and lives in subtropical climates.
