= Stenden =

Stenden may refer to:

- Stende, Latvia
- Stenden, North Rhine-Westphalia, part of Kerken, Germany
- Stenden University also known as Stenden Hogeschool, a private educational facility in Leeuwarden, the Netherlands
