= Stenden Rangsit University =

- Motto: Unleash your potential, and live the dream...
- Type: Private
- Dean: Sandy Loup
- Location: Bangkok, Thailand; 13.901432°N 100.533497°E
- Colors: Blue & Purple
- Nickname: SRU
- Mascot: Swallow
- Website: http://www.stendenrangsit.com

Stenden Rangsit University (SRU) is a satellite campus of Stenden University of Applied Sciences in the Netherlands, and is based on the campus of the Rangsit University near Bangkok in the Kingdom of Thailand. It is a joint venture between Rangsit University and Stenden University of Applied Sciences of the Netherlands. Stenden Rangsit University has moved to partner with Panyapiwat Institute of Management since August 2016 and the name has been changed to Stenden Thailand.

- Stenden Rangsit University provides Business Management training in the form of a double BBA degree, aimed primarily at hotel management, as well as specialist health and spa management, events management, protocol and diplomatic studies, and tourism education.
- The International Hotel Management programme (IHM) is the primary degree programme at Stenden Rangsit University. Students graduate at the end of a four-year period with dual BBA degrees, one each from Rangsit University in Thailand, and one from Stenden university in the Netherlands.
