= MS Michael Sars =

Åland shipping Academy

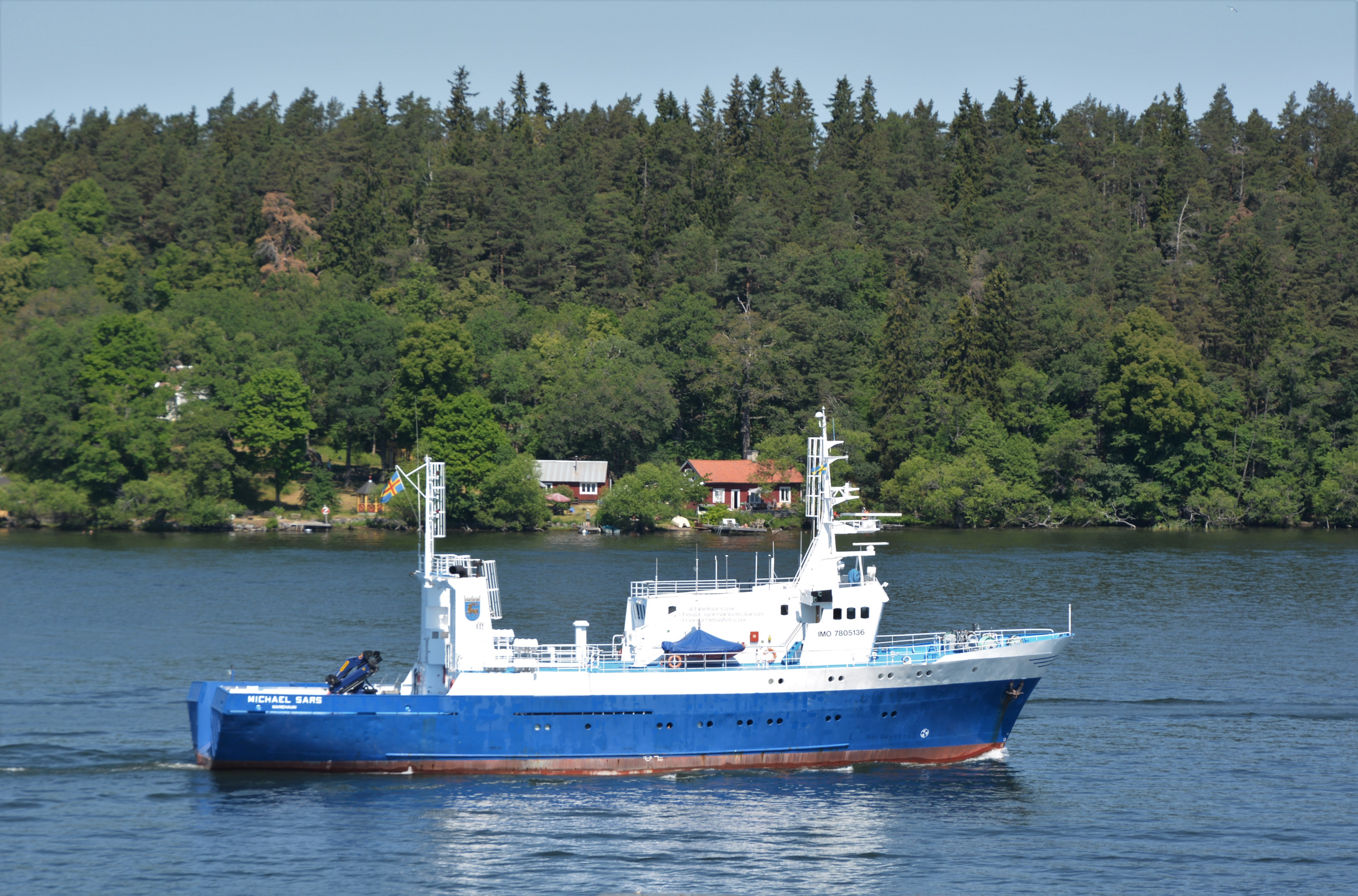
- MS Michael Sars

History

Finland
- Name: Michael Sars
- Owner: Åland, operated by Alandica Shipping Academy
- Builder: Mjellem & Karlsen Verft in Bergen, Norway
- Launched: 1979
- Identification: IMO number: 7805136
- Status: In active service as of 2025

General characteristics
- Tonnage: 690/207
- Length: 47.50 m (155 ft 10 in)
- Beam: 10.3 m (33 ft 10 in)
- Draught: 4.3 m (14 ft 1 in)
- Depth of hold: 4.3 m (14 ft 1 in)
- Propulsion: 9-cylinder diesel engine
- Complement: 45 passengers

MS Michael Sars is a training ship operated by Alandica Shipping Academy in Åland. The ship is named after the Norwegian marine biologist Michael Sars.

She was built in 1979 as a research vessel for the Norwegian Institute of Marine Research in Bergen. She was sold in 2003 and has since 2005 been a training ship in the Åland Islands by university and vocational levels, as well as training of seafarers.

Michael Sars is owned by Åland and operated by Alandica Shipping Academy (formerly Åland Maritime Safety Center).

== Bilder ==
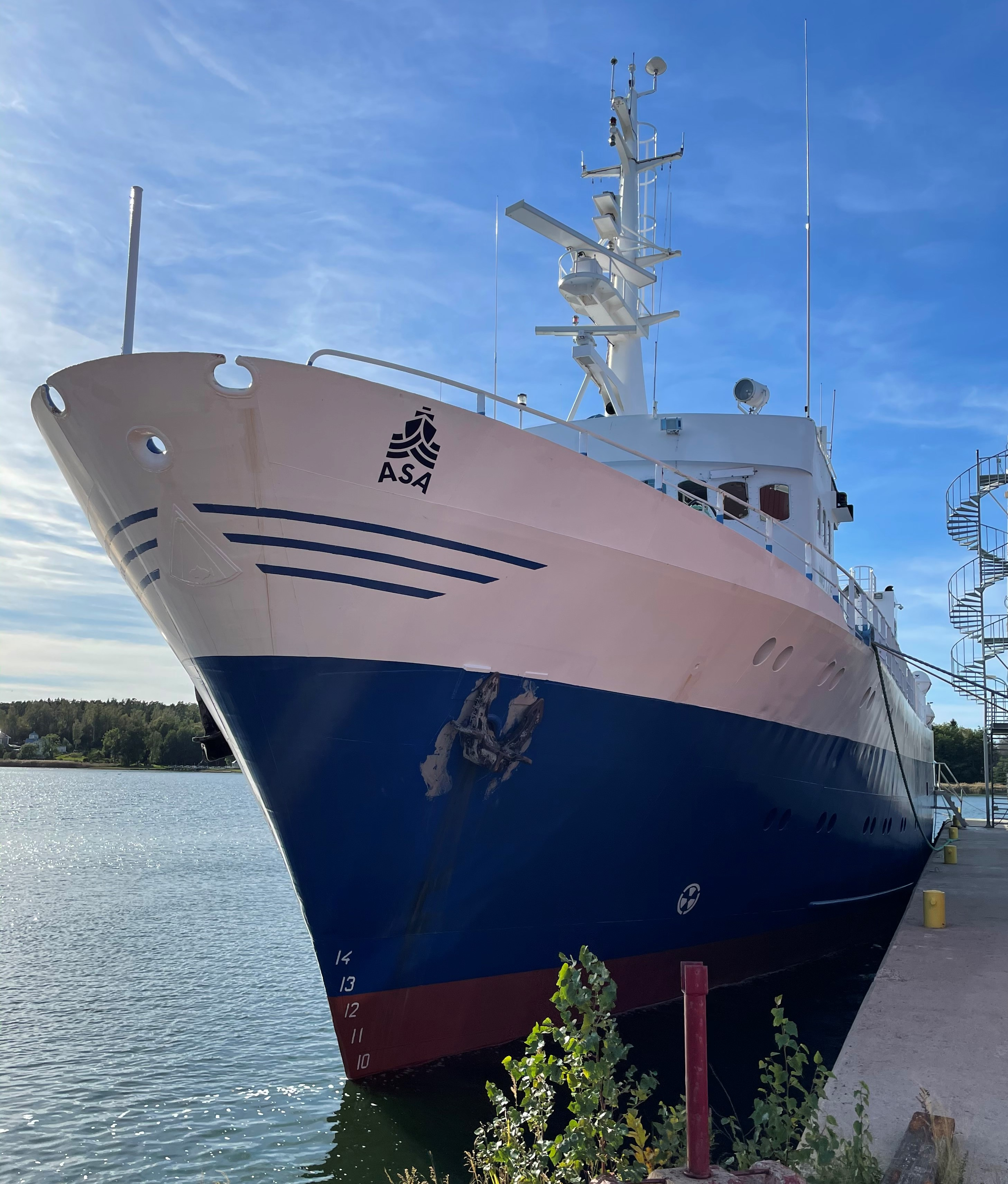
M/S Michael Sars docked in Mariehamn

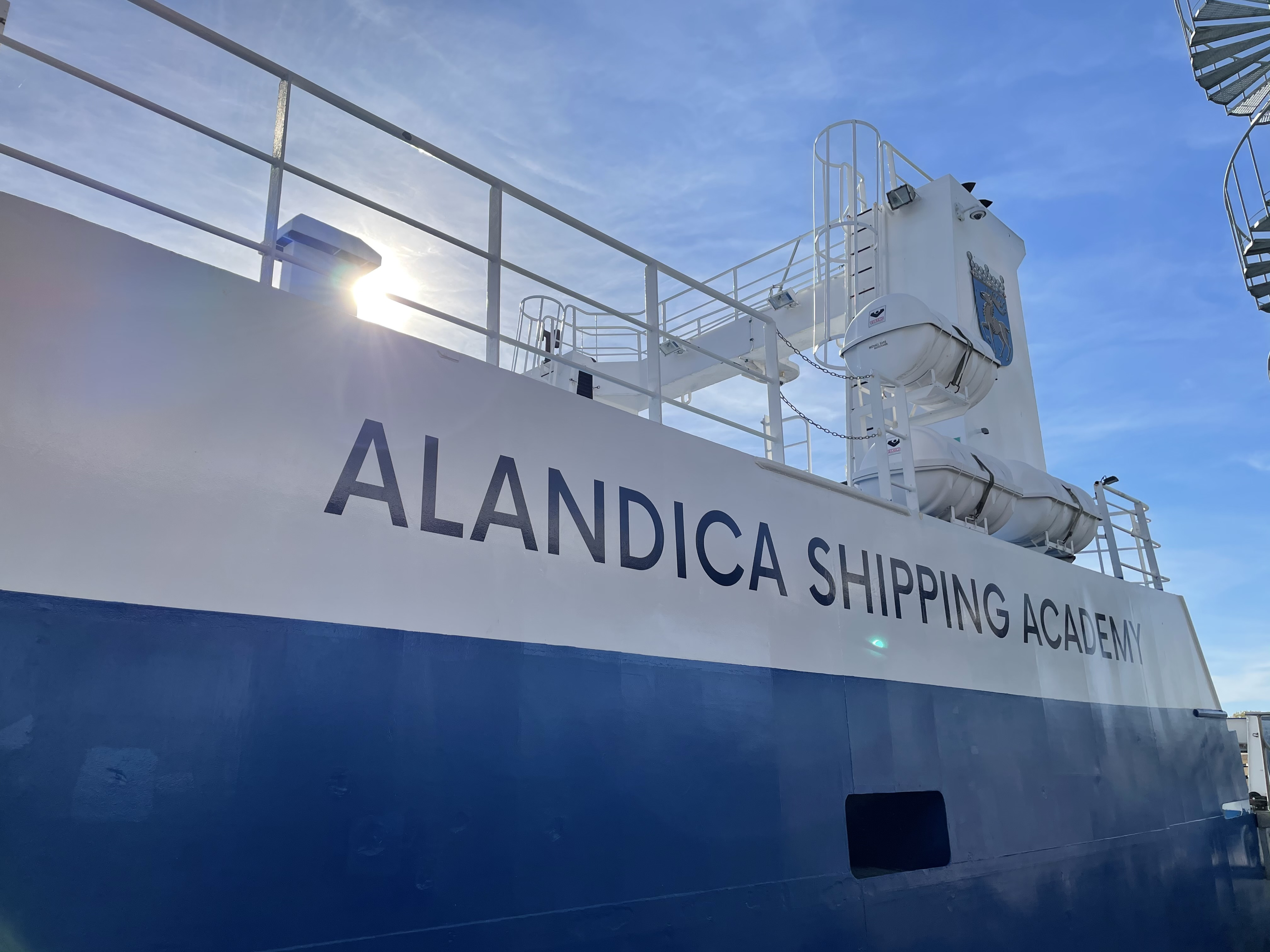
M/S Michael Sars is operated by Alandica Shipping Academy

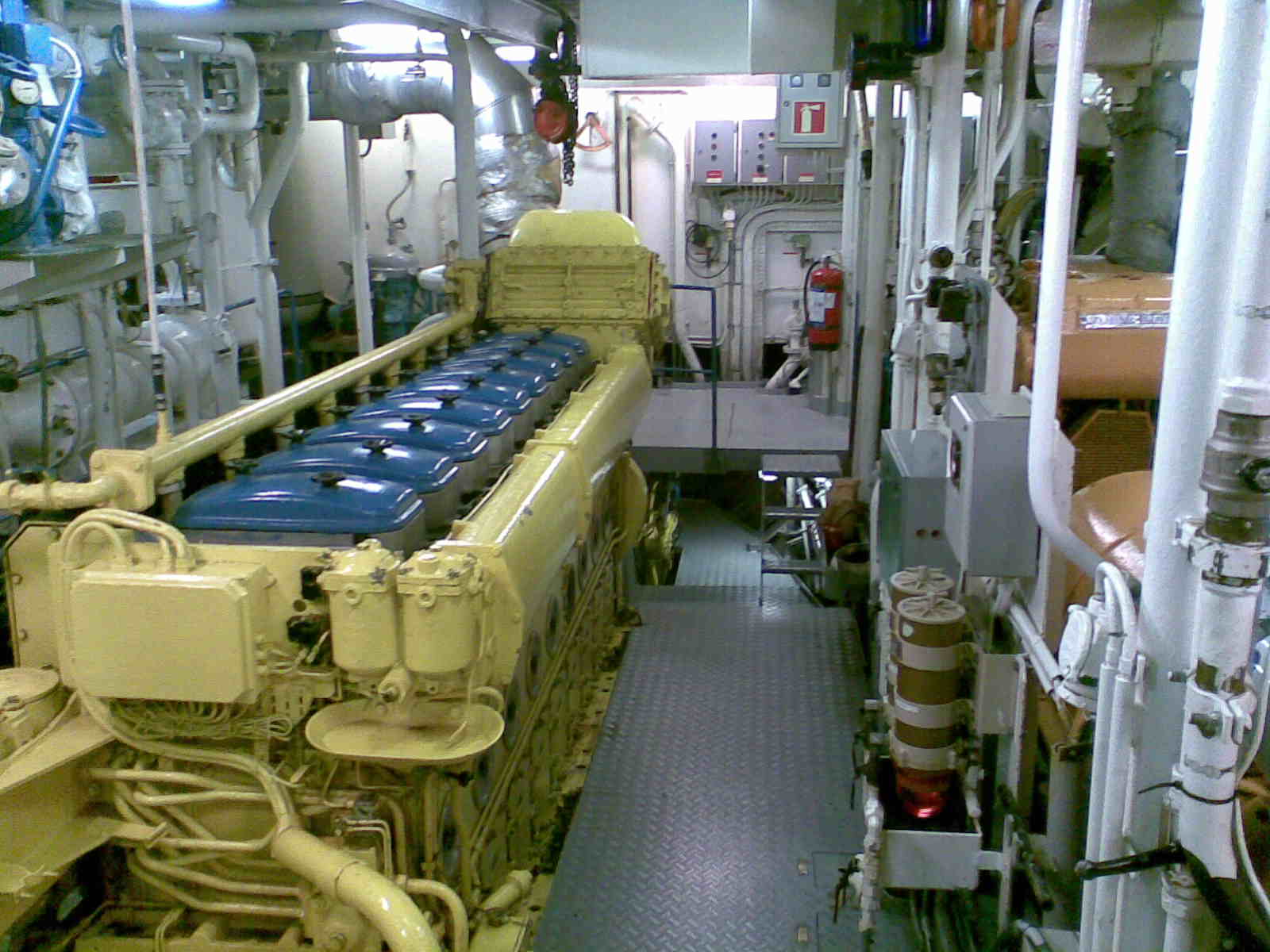
Machine room of M/S Michael Sars
