= International Association for Safety and Survival Training =

- Abbreviation: IASST
- Formation: 1980; 46 years ago
- Region served: International
- Website: iasst.com

International Association for Safety and Survival Training (also IASST) is an international organisation with the goal of improving efficiency of safety and survival training to save lives of seafarers. IASST was founded in 1980. IASST has over 150 members in more than 50 countries.

== Members ==
Example of members include

- Alandica Shipping Academy, ASA, Åland, Finland
- ASK Safety, Norway
- CEPS, France
- Maritime Instituut Willem Barentsz, Netherlands
- Maritime Safety & Survival Training LLC, USA
- Maritime Safety and Survival Training Centre, Iceland
- N2M Consulting Inc., Canada
- Novikontas Maritime College, Latvia
- OPEANS NIGERIA Limited, Nigeria
- Regional Medical Office, Russia
- Sribima Marine Training Centre, Malaysia
- Survival Systems, Canada

== Yearly conference ==
The yearly conference has been organised by

- 2021 Alandica Shipping Academy, Åland, Finland
- 2019 ASK Safety, Ålesund, Norway
- 2018 Maritime Instituut Willem Barentsz, Netherlands
- 2014 NOSEFO, Bergen, Norway
