= Stenden University Qatar =

Al Rayyan University (previously Stenden University Qatar) is a private university located in Bin Omran, Doha, Qatar. It was established in 2000 as the first private university in Qatar, originally operating as a joint venture between Al Rayyan International Education and Stenden University of Applied Sciences from the Netherlands. The campus is situated on Al-Jeleait Street near Castle Gardens in Doha.

In 2021, the university rebranded as Al Rayyan International University College (ARIU), ending its affiliation with Stenden University and establishing a new academic partnership with the University of Derby in the United Kingdom. ARIU now offers UK-accredited undergraduate and postgraduate degrees in fields such as International Hospitality Management, International Tourism Management, and International Business Management.

== History ==
The partnership between Al Rayyan International Education and Stenden University of Applied Sciences was established in 2000 and concluded in 2020. In September 2021, Al Rayyan International University College was officially launched under a new collaboration with the University of Derby, offering internationally recognized programs and expanding Qatar’s higher education landscape.

== Academic Programs ==
Bachelor’s Programs

- BA (Hons) International Hospitality Management
- BA (Hons) International Tourism Management
- BA (Hons) International Business (Top-Up)
- BSc (Hons) International Business Management

Master’s Programs

- MBA Global
- MBA Global Hospitality Management
- MSc Tourism Management

Language Courses

- Arabic Language Level 1 Basics
- Business English Writing
- Business English Communication

== Enrolment ==
ARIU enrolls students twice annually, in February and September, following the admission requirements of the University of Derby. All graduates receive UK-accredited degrees awarded by the University of Derby.

== Graduation ==
Graduation ceremonies are typically held in June each year, where students are formally awarded their degrees.

== See also ==
- Education in Qatar
- University of Derby
- Stenden University of Applied Sciences
