= Stenden South Africa =

Institution of higher education in South Africa

- Type: Private
- Established: 10 April 2002
- Parent institution: Stenden University of Applied Sciences
- Executive Dean: Dr Wouter Hensens
- Location: Port Alfred, Sarah Baartman District Municipality, Eastern Cape, South Africa; 33.59960687401707°S 26.892270861938343°E
- Registration No: 2002/HE10/001
- Colours: Night blue and Telemagenta
- Mascot: Swallow
- Website: www.stenden.ac.za

Stenden South Africa is an Institution of Higher Education, located in Port Alfred in the Eastern Cape province of South Africa. It is owned by NHL Stenden University of Applied Sciences in The Netherlands. It was founded in 2002 and offers two specialised degree programmes: Bachelor of Business Administration (BBA) in Disaster Management and Bachelor of Commerce (BCom) in Hospitality Management.

== History ==
Stenden South Africa was established in 2002 in what was up to then known as the Grand Hotel in Port Alfred. The hotel was adapted to fit the requirements of a university campus and at present all hotel rooms are occupied by students. The initial name under which Stenden South Africa operated was EISS: The Educational Institute for Service Studies. In 2019 CHN University and Drenthe University merged, forming Stenden University, therefore causing EISS to become Stenden South Africa. By South African law, only public universities are allowed to use the name 'university' which is why the additive 'South Africa' was chosen. In 2019 Stenden University merged with NHL University and became NHL Stenden University of Applied Sciences.

== Organisation ==
NHL Stenden University of Applied Sciences is an international university which has locations in the Netherlands: Leeuwarden (head office), Groningen, Meppel, Assen, Emmen, and international Grand Tour sites inPort Alfred (South Africa), Bangkok (Thailand) and Bali (Indonesia). With the unique "Grand Tour" concept students have the possibility to study at all Stenden's locations abroad. NHL Stenden has more than 2000 employees and about 23,000 students, including 2500 international students from 65 different nationalities.

Stenden South Africa is a campus site of Stenden University of Applied Sciences offering a Bachelors program in Hospitality Management and a Bachelors program in Disaster Management for locally based students, as well as different minor programs for "Grand Tour" students. It is registered with the Department of Education of South Africa to offer the Bachelor of Commerce in Hospitality Management and the Bachelor of Business Administration Disaster Management; the programmes are registered with South African Qualifications Authority (SAQA).

=== Governance ===
The director of Stenden South Africa is the chairman of the executive board of NHL Stenden University. In 2024, Mr. Marc Otto was appointed in this role. The head of the institution is the Executive Dean, Dr. Wouter Hensens, who is responsible for the executive management of the institution. The Executive Dean reports to a Board of Governors composed of local stakeholders that advise the executive board of Stenden University. The Board of Governors is headed by Mr. Adrian Gardiner, owner and chairman of the Mantis collection of Hotels and founder of Shamwari Game Reserve. The faculty is headed up by Academic Dean Dr. Juliet Chipumuro.

=== Campus ===
Facilities on campus include accommodation, a dining hall offering three meals per day, Library, Computer Lab, Coffee Bar, Student Lounge ("Swallows Nest"), parking facilities, class-rooms, auditorium and Practical Kitchen. Al areas of the campus and student accommodations are equipped with high speed Wi-Fi.

=== Student life ===
Stenden South Africa has a very active Student Representative Council (SRC), with portfolios that cover all aspects of student life: Academic Quality, Food, Entertainment, Sport, and Residencies. As part of the commitment to community development, Stenden South Africa encourages students to take part in 'Commmuden'. There are several projects these students are involved in within the Ndlambe to uplift the community.

=== Learning Hotel ===
Stenden South Africa manages the MyPond Hotel in Port Alfred. Students of the Hotel Management School (B.Com. Hospitality Management) perform learning tasks in this hotel, ranging from operational duties to supervisory and managerial functions. In this way, students will learn all aspects of hotel management. This is all part of the "Real World Learning" concept that pervades the Bachelor programmes of Stenden University of Applied Sciences. The Stenden MyPond Hotel has been nominated for the Lilizela Service Excellence Awards in 2013 and 2014 and was the winner of the Sunshine Coast Tourism Accommodation Excellence Awards in the Hotel category in 2015. The Lily restaurant in the MyPond Hotel was elected the Best Restaurant in the Eastern Cape in December 2014.
