= Åland University of Applied Sciences =

Institute of higher education in Mariehamn, Åland

- Högskolan på Åland
- Type: University of applied sciences
- Established: 1 January 2003
- Rector: Johanna Mattila
- Students: Approximately 500
- Location: Mariehamn, Åland, Finland; 60.1033°N 19.9291°E
- Website: www.ha.ax
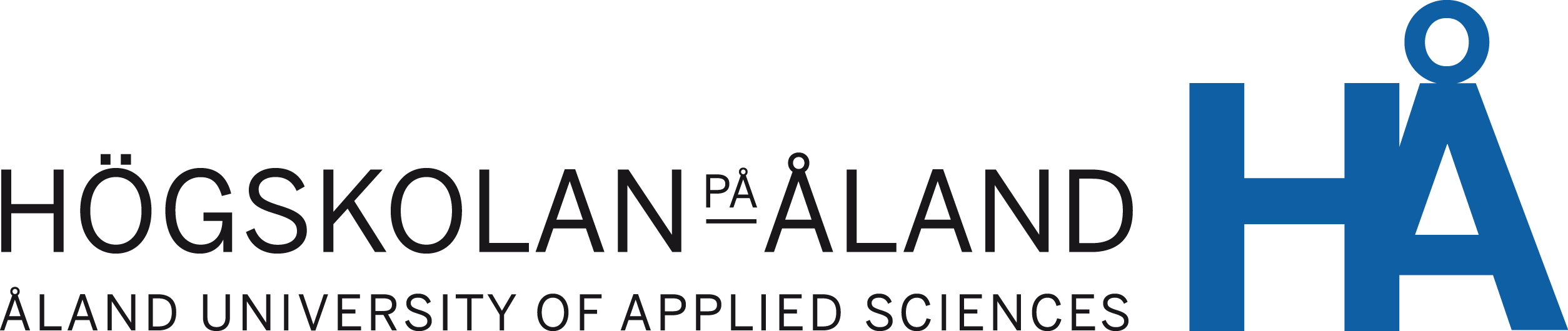

Åland University of Applied Sciences (Högskolan på Åland, HÅ) is a Swedish-language university of applied sciences located in Mariehamn, Åland, Finland. It is the only higher education institution in the Åland Islands and is administered by the Government of Åland.

The university operates from three main buildings:

- North building (Neptunigatan 17)
- West building (Neptunigatan 6)
- South building (Navigationsskolegränd 2)

Approximately 550 full-time students are enrolled, primarily from Åland and Sweden. The university employs around 60 staff members.

== History ==
Åland University of Applied Sciences (Åland UAS) was established through the merger of several institutions, each with a significant history in Åland's higher education.

Education for Master Mariners dates to the mid-19th century when maritime navigation training began in Åland. The School of Navigation (Navigationsskolan) introduced a mechanical engineering program in the 1930s. In 1943, this school was renamed The Åland Institute of Marine Technology (Ålands sjöfartsläroverk).

The mechanical engineering program became an independent institution, The Åland School of Technology (Ålands tekniska skola), in 1968. This institution was subsequently renamed The Åland Institute of Technology (Ålands tekniska högskola) in 1988. An automation system engineering program, a field within electrotechnical engineering, was added to The Åland School of Technology in 1984.

The Åland Polytechnic was launched as a pilot project in 1997. It involved cooperation among the following institutions:

- The Åland Institute of Technology
- The Åland Institute of Marine Technology
- The Åland Institute of Business Education
- The Åland Institute of Hotel and Restaurant Education
- The Åland Institute of Health Care Education

Åland UAS was officially established on 1 January 2003, by merging the Åland Polytechnic and the Åland Open University. Concurrently, The Åland Institute of Technology and The Åland Institute of Marine Technology were dissolved and became part of Åland UAS. The Åland Open University was then renamed The Open University and became a department within Åland UAS.

== Degree Programs ==
Åland University of Applied Sciences offers the following seven degree programs:

- Business Administration
- Electrotechnical Engineering
- Health and Caring Sciences
- Hospitality Management
- Information Technology
- Marine Engineering
- Marine Technology (Navigation)

== The Open University ==
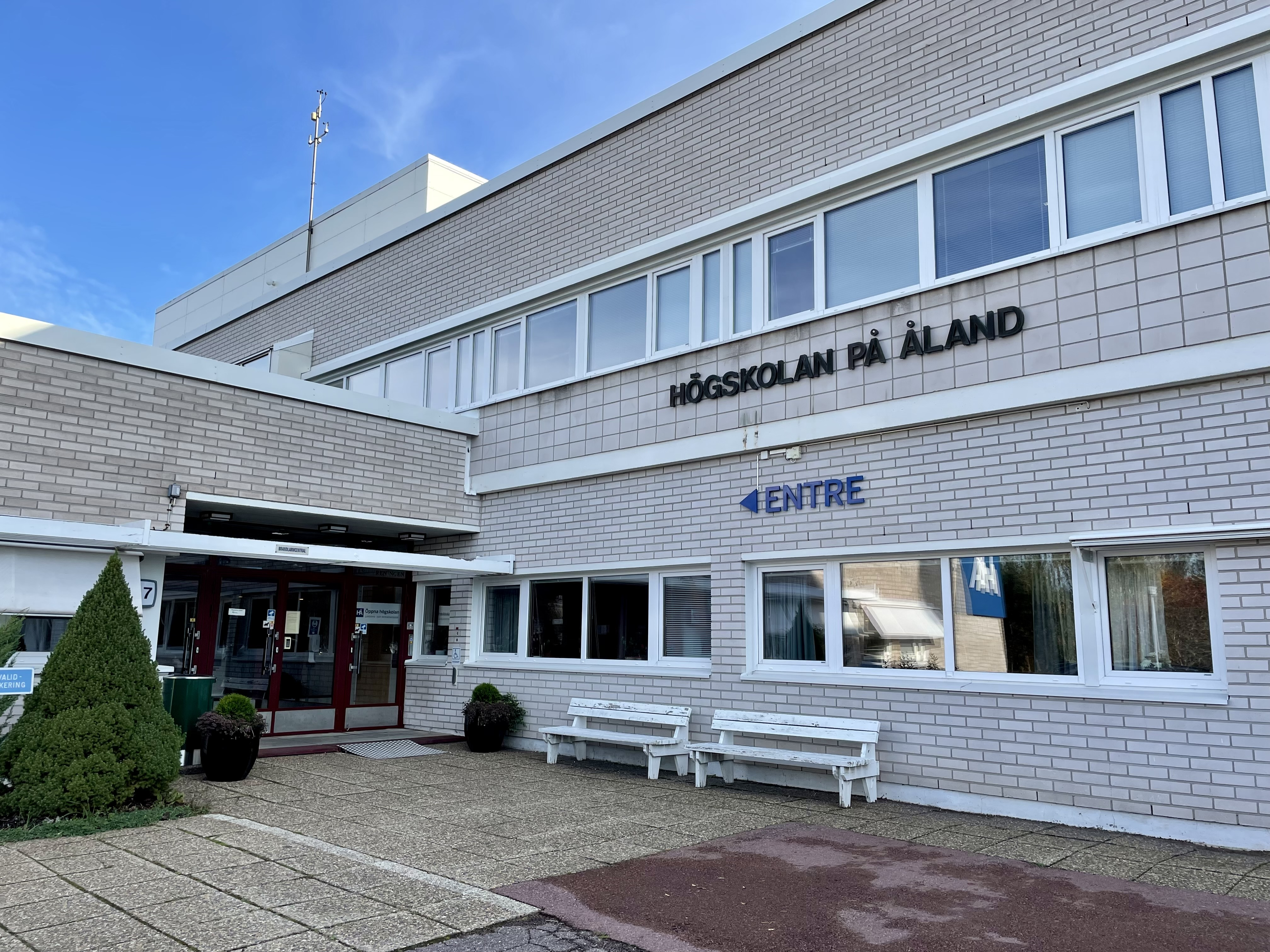
The North building of Åland UAS

The Open University, a department within Åland UAS, offers university-level courses in cooperation with other universities. In 2020, it recorded 2,198 course participants.

The Open University was founded on 1 June 1969, initially as The Summer University of Åland, and later known as The Åland University.

== Library ==
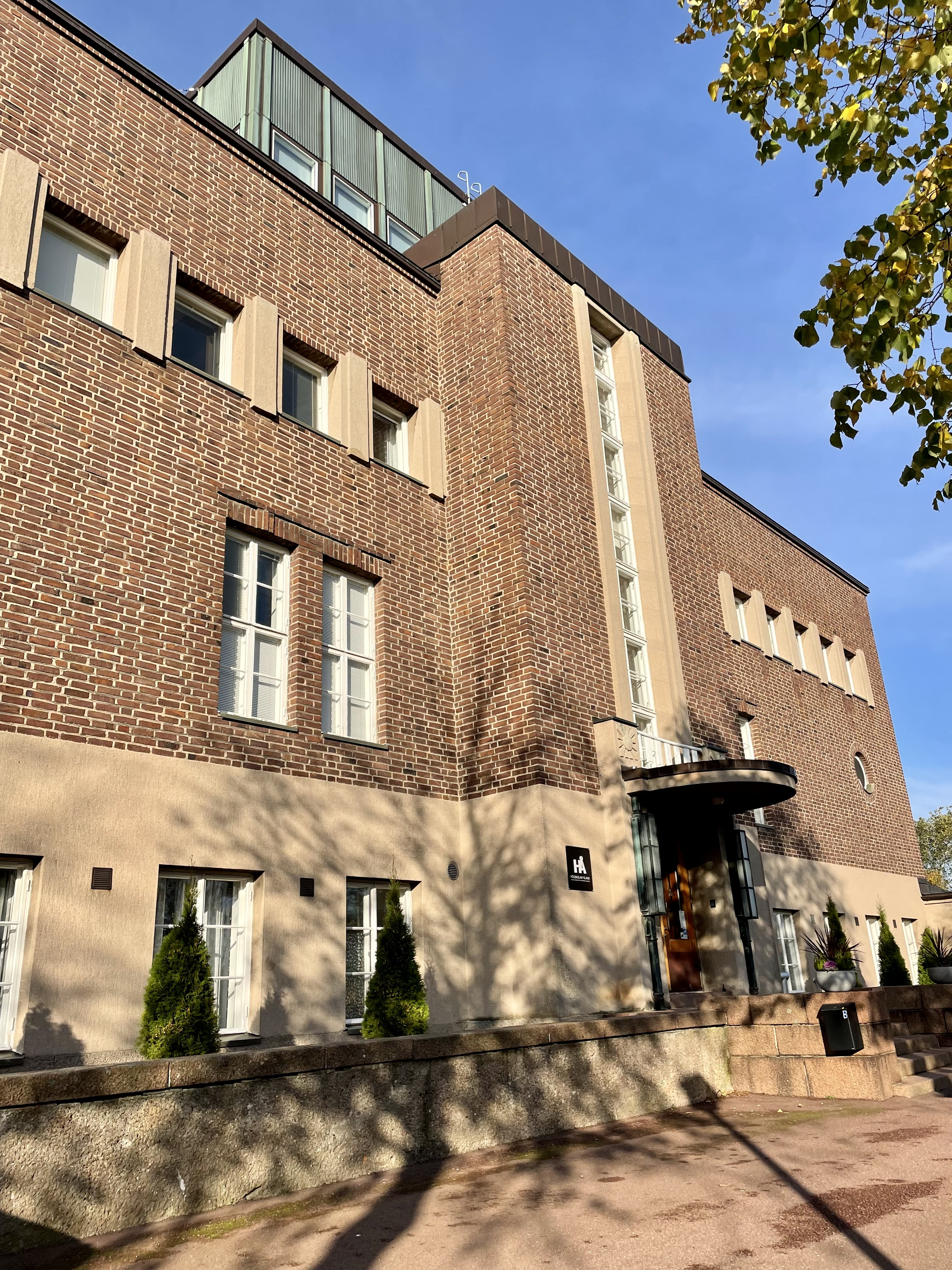
The South building of Åland UAS

The Åland UAS library is co-located with the Mariehamn City Library. The university library's materials are integrated with those of the Mariehamn City Library. However, course literature (textbooks) forms a separate section known as the course book library. In addition to providing books, the university library assists students with information retrieval.

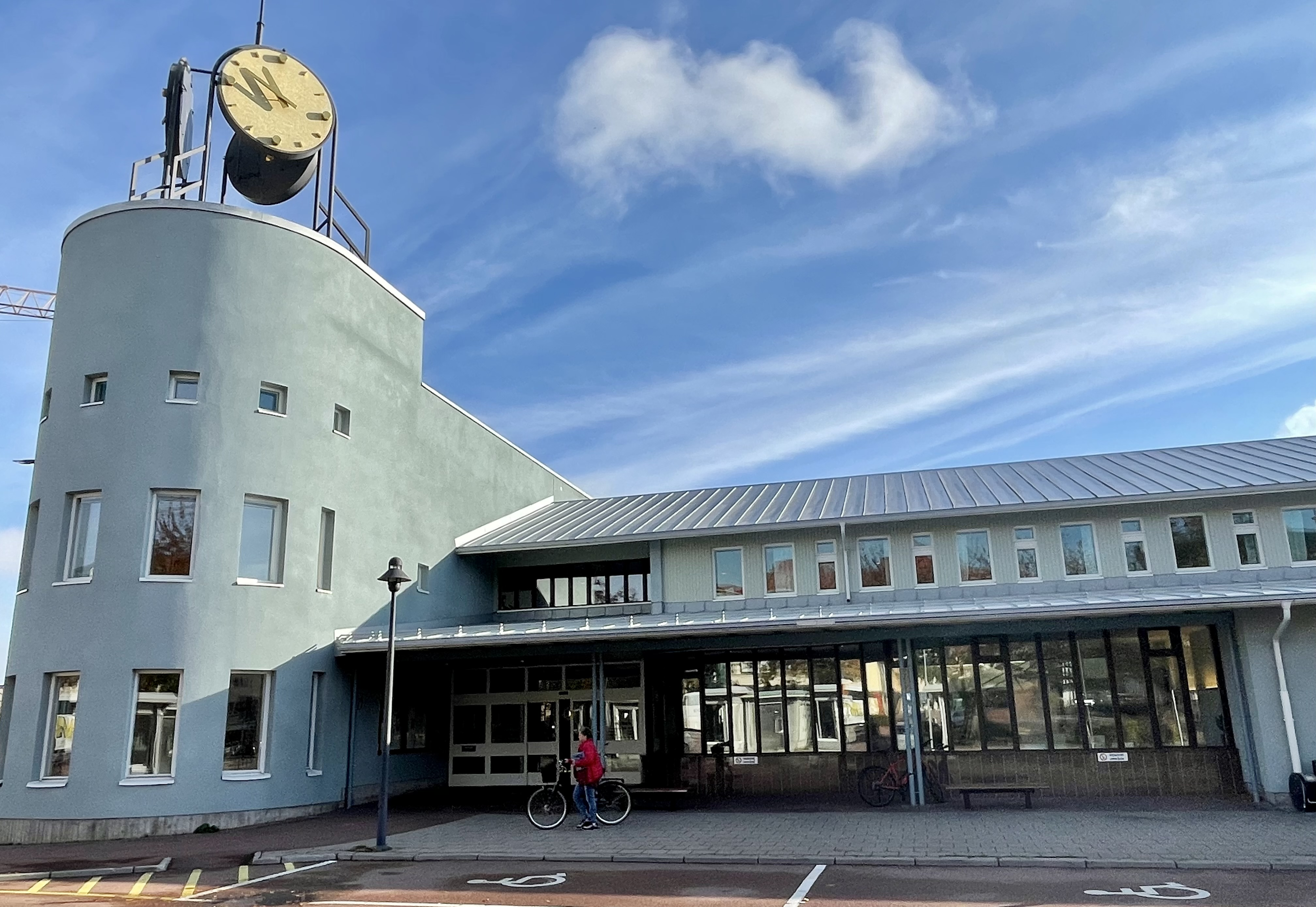
The library, shared with Mariehamn City Library

== Research ==
Åland UAS conducts basic and applied research that supports its teaching and benefits the local community. Faculty members carry out research in their areas of expertise, often collaborating with national and international partners. Key research areas include electrotechnical engineering and health and caring sciences.

== Internationalization ==
Internationalization is an integral part of Åland UAS's activities. The university offers exchange programs for its students and staff with partner universities. Students can participate in exchange studies, primarily in Nordic countries or other parts of Europe, and international internships are available worldwide. Academic and other staff can also participate in exchanges with partner institutions. Guest lecturers from partner universities and companies contribute to the international atmosphere. Åland UAS also engages in various international projects and participates in higher education programs such as Erasmus+ and Nordplus.

== Student Union ==
The student union at Åland UAS is named SkÅHla. It represents student interests in the university's decision-making processes and organizes social and recreational activities for students.

== See also ==
- Alandica Shipping Academy
