= Mangelia tranquilla =

Scientific classification
- Kingdom: Animalia
- Phylum: Mollusca
- Class: Gastropoda
- Subclass: Caenogastropoda
- Order: Neogastropoda
- Superfamily: Conoidea
- Family: Mangeliidae
- Genus: Mangelia
- Species: M. tranquilla

Binomial name
- Mangelia tranquilla K.H. Barnard, 1958

Synonyms
- Mangilia tranquilla K.H. Barnard, 1958

Species of sea snail

Mangelia tranquilla is a species of sea snail, a marine gastropod mollusk in the family Mangeliidae.

== Description ==
The shell grows to a length of 2 mm, its diameter is 1.5 mm.

== Distribution ==
This marine species is found off East London, South Africa.
