= Alandica Shipping Academy =

- Alandica Shipping Academy
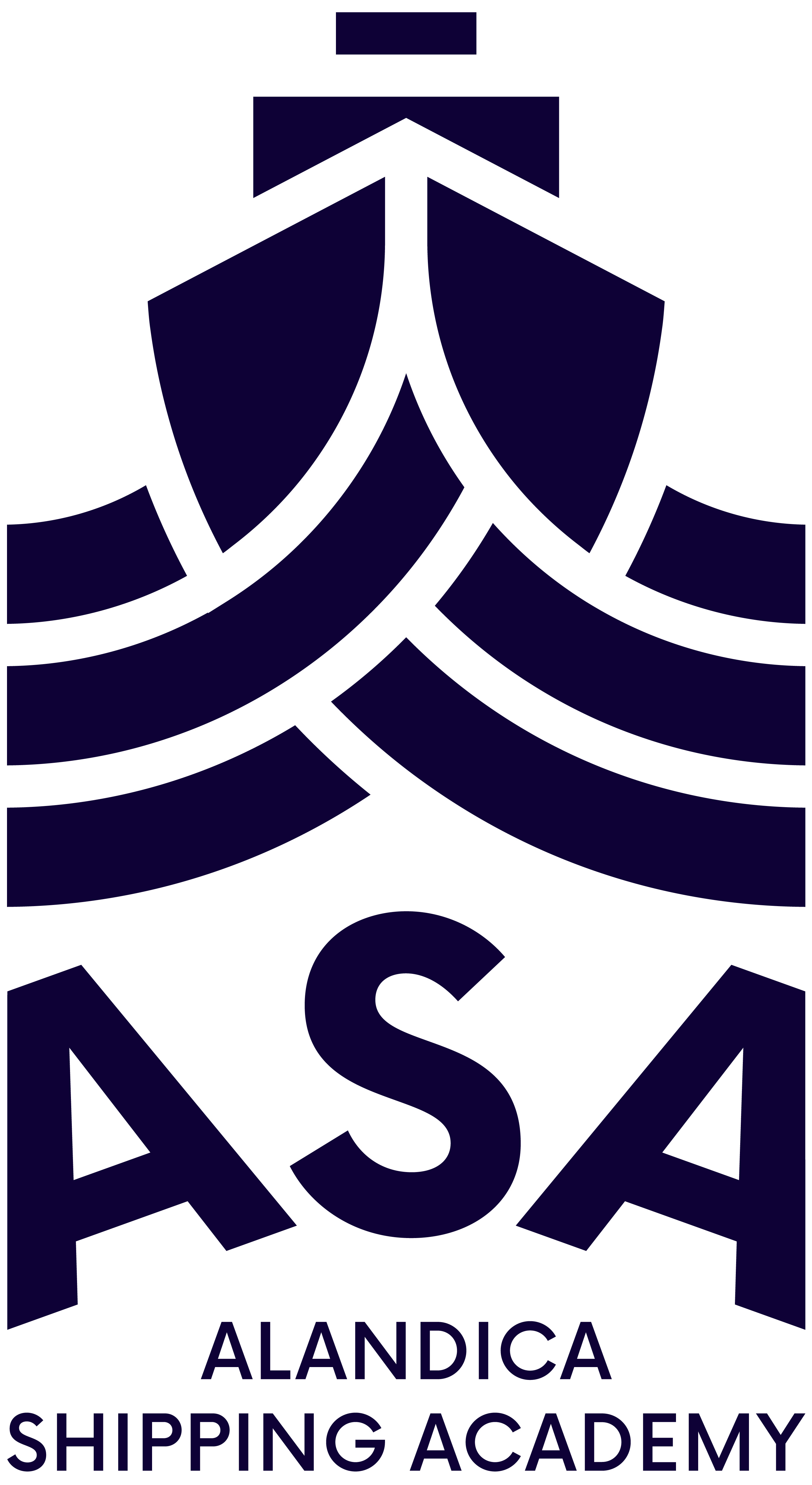
- Abbreviation: ASA
- Predecessor: Åland Maritime Safety Center
- Formation: 2020
- Founder: Government of Åland
- Type: Educational organization
- Purpose: Maritime education and training
- Location: Mariehamn, Åland, Finland
- Services: Maritime courses, vocational education, degree programs
- Official language: Swedish, Finnish, English
- Manager of ASA: Kristoffer Joelsson
- Website: www.asa.ax/en

Alandica Shipping Academy (ASA) provides maritime education and training in Åland, Finland. It commenced operations in 2020. ASA offers basic and refresher courses for seafarers, as well as training at the vocational high school and college levels. Education takes place at Ålands yrkesgymnasium, Åland University of Applied Sciences, and Alandica Shipping Academy's own facilities. ASA also uses the school ship M/S Michael Sars for training. ASA is a member of the IASST.

== Education ==
=== STCW Courses ===
Alandica Shipping Academy's courses are certified by both the Finnish Transport and Communications Agency (Traficom) and the Swedish Transport Agency. The courses meet the international standards of the STCW Convention (International Convention on Standards of Training, Certification and Watchkeeping for Seafarers). ASA continues to offer STCW courses, a role previously held by its predecessor, Åland Maritime Safety Center, which began offering these courses in 1999. Key STCW courses include:

- Survival Craft and Rescue Boats (Basic and Advanced) STCW A-VI 2.1
- Basic Safety Training STCW A-VI/1
- Advanced Fire Fighting STCW A-VI/3
- Fast Rescue Boats STCW A-VI/2.2

=== Vocational Education ===
ASA coordinates vocational maritime education with Ålands yrkesgymnasium (Åland Vocational High School). Programs offered include:

- Repairman
- Deck Officer
- Watchkeeping Engineer
- Electro-technical Rating

=== Degree Programs ===
ASA offers degree programs in maritime studies in cooperation with Åland University of Applied Sciences. These include:

- Electro-technical Engineering
- Marine/Mechanical Engineering
- Marine Technology (Navigation)
- Business Administration (focus on shipping)
- Hospitality Management

== Background ==
In autumn 2019, the Government of Åland decided to establish Alandica Shipping Academy (ASA). The aim was to foster collaboration among three key maritime educational institutions: Åland University of Applied Sciences, Ålands yrkesgymnasium, and the former Åland Maritime Safety Center. This collaboration was intended to enhance marketing efforts and provide more customer-oriented education, in accordance with Åland law 2003:17.

=== Milestones in Maritime Education in the Åland Islands ===
1854 Navigation education in the Åland Islands commenced at Ålands folkhögskola (Åland Folk High School).

1868 Mariehamn Navigation School (Navigationsskolan i Mariehamn) was founded. The school trained nautical officers for the North Sea and Baltic Sea.

1874 Education of Sea captains began.

1935 Mechanical engineering education started at Högre Navigationsskolan i Mariehamn (Mariehamn Higher Navigation School).

1938 The Mariehamn Navigation School building, designed by architect Lars Sonck, was completed.

1944 Högre Navigationsskolan became Ålands Sjöfartsläroverk (Åland Institute of Marine Technology).

1961 Ålands sjömansskola (Ålands sjömansskola; Eng: Åland's Seaman's School), now part of Ålands yrkesgymnasium, was founded.

1997 Åland Maritime Safety Center was founded.

2003 Ålands sjöfartsläroverk became part of Åland University of Applied Sciences.

2005 The M/S Michael Sars became a school ship, owned by the Government of Åland and operated by the Åland Maritime Safety Center.

2020 Alandica Shipping Academy was founded. The Åland Maritime Safety Center was incorporated into Alandica Shipping Academy, which now also coordinates maritime education offerings from Åland University of Applied Sciences and Ålands yrkesgymnasium.

== Pictures ==
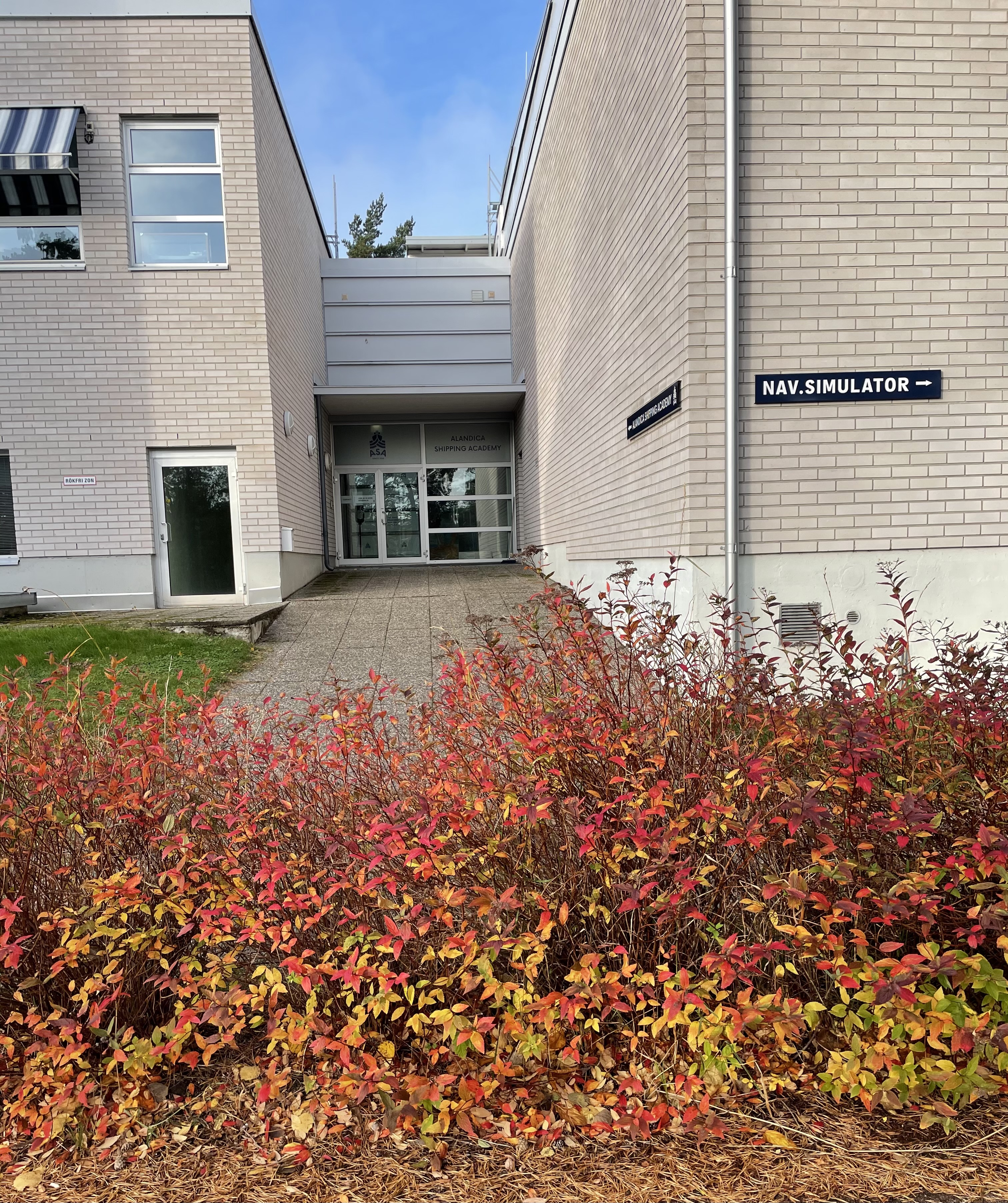
Alandica Shipping Academy training pool

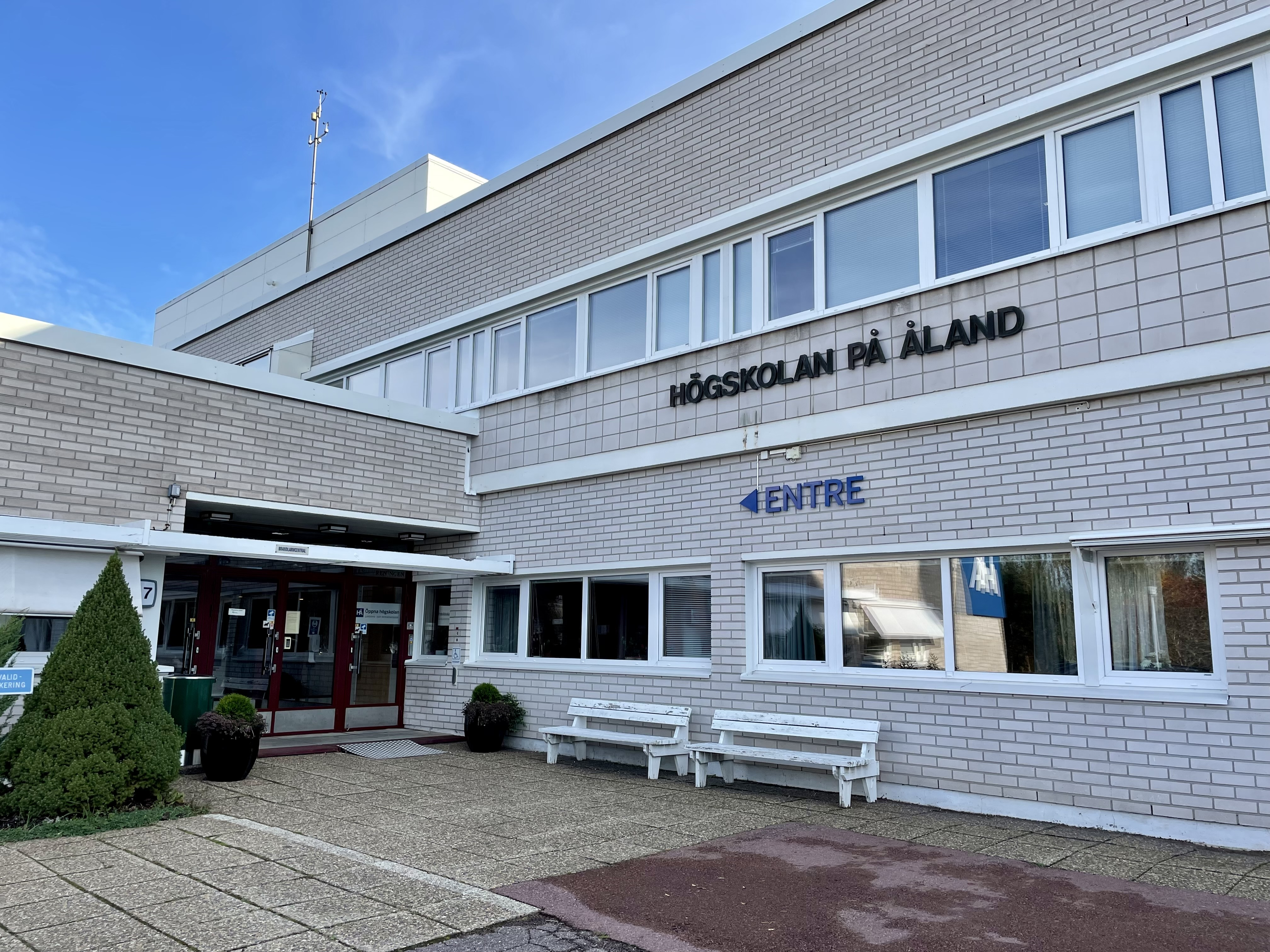
Åland University of Applied Sciences, a partner institution

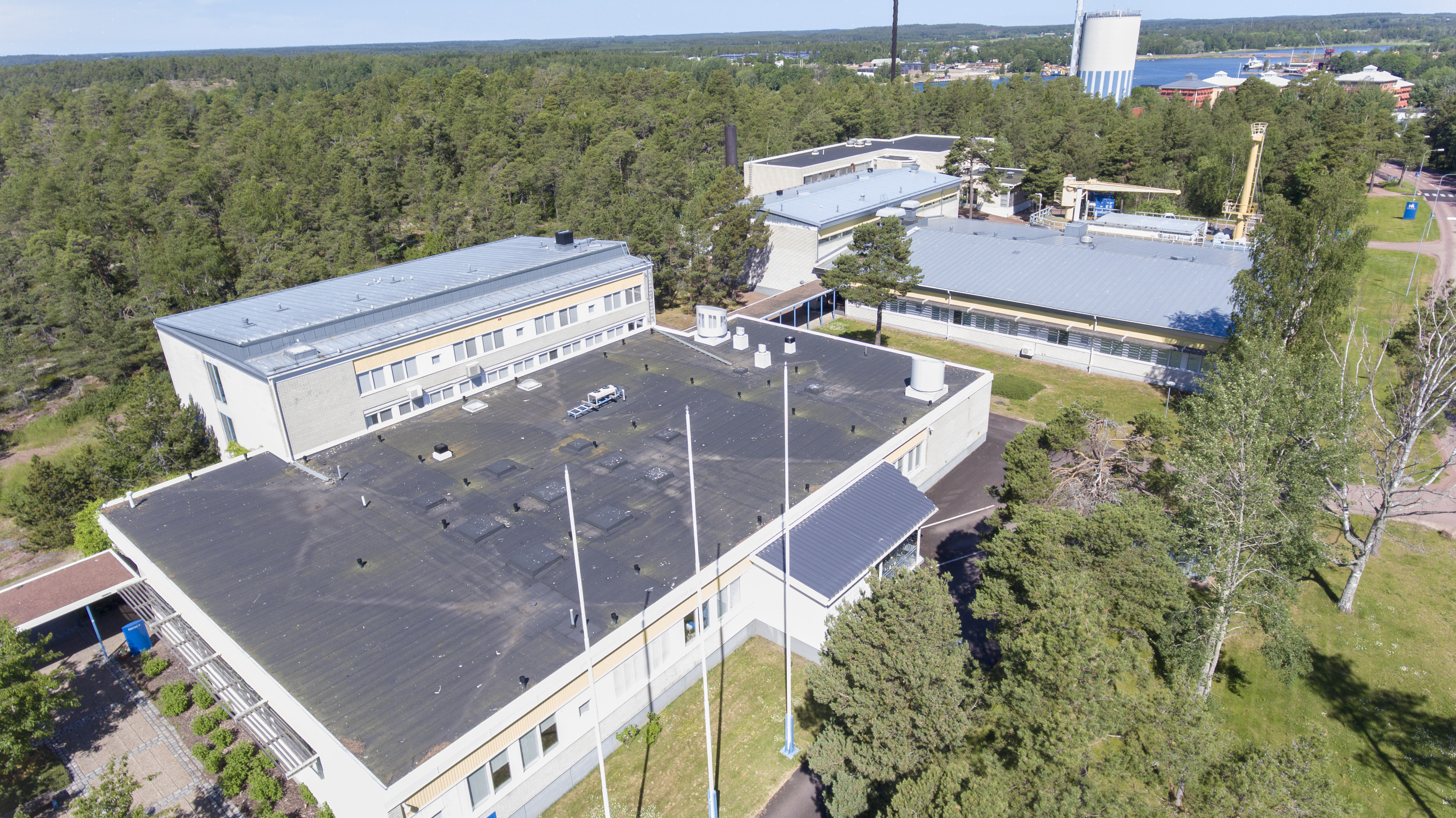
Maritime programs at Ålands yrkesgymnasium, a partner institution

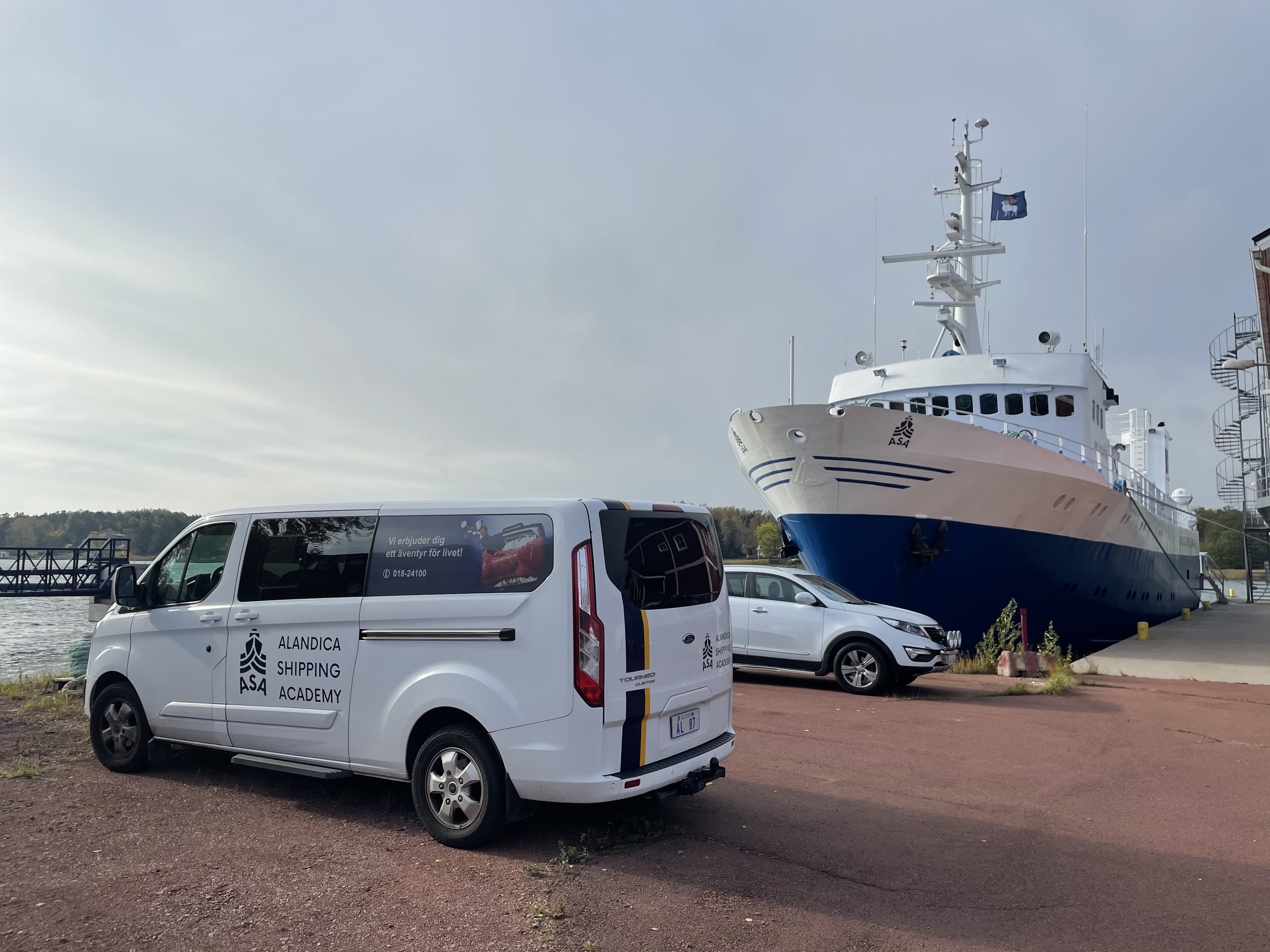
M/S Michael Sars, ASA's school ship

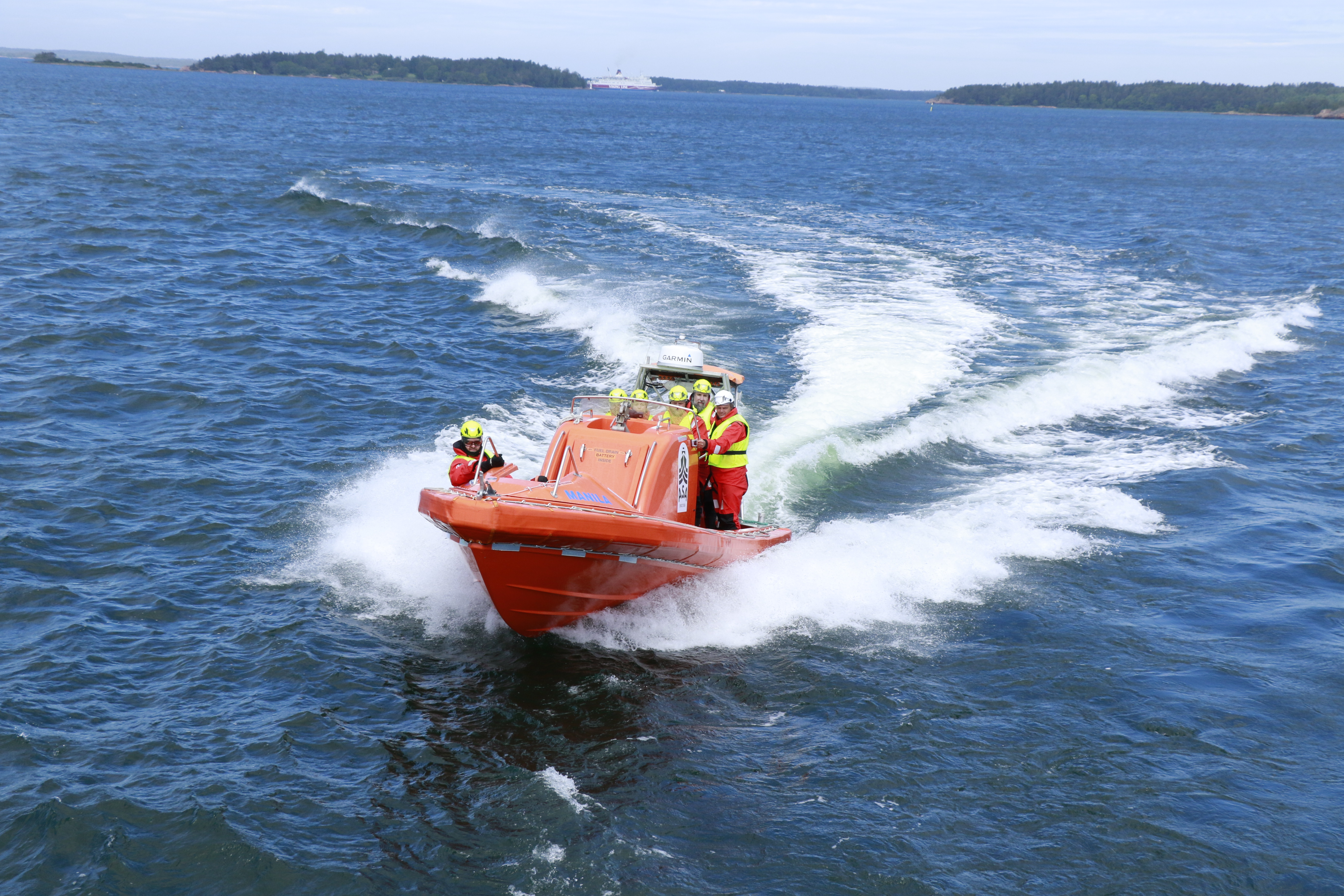
STCW Course: Fast Rescue Boat

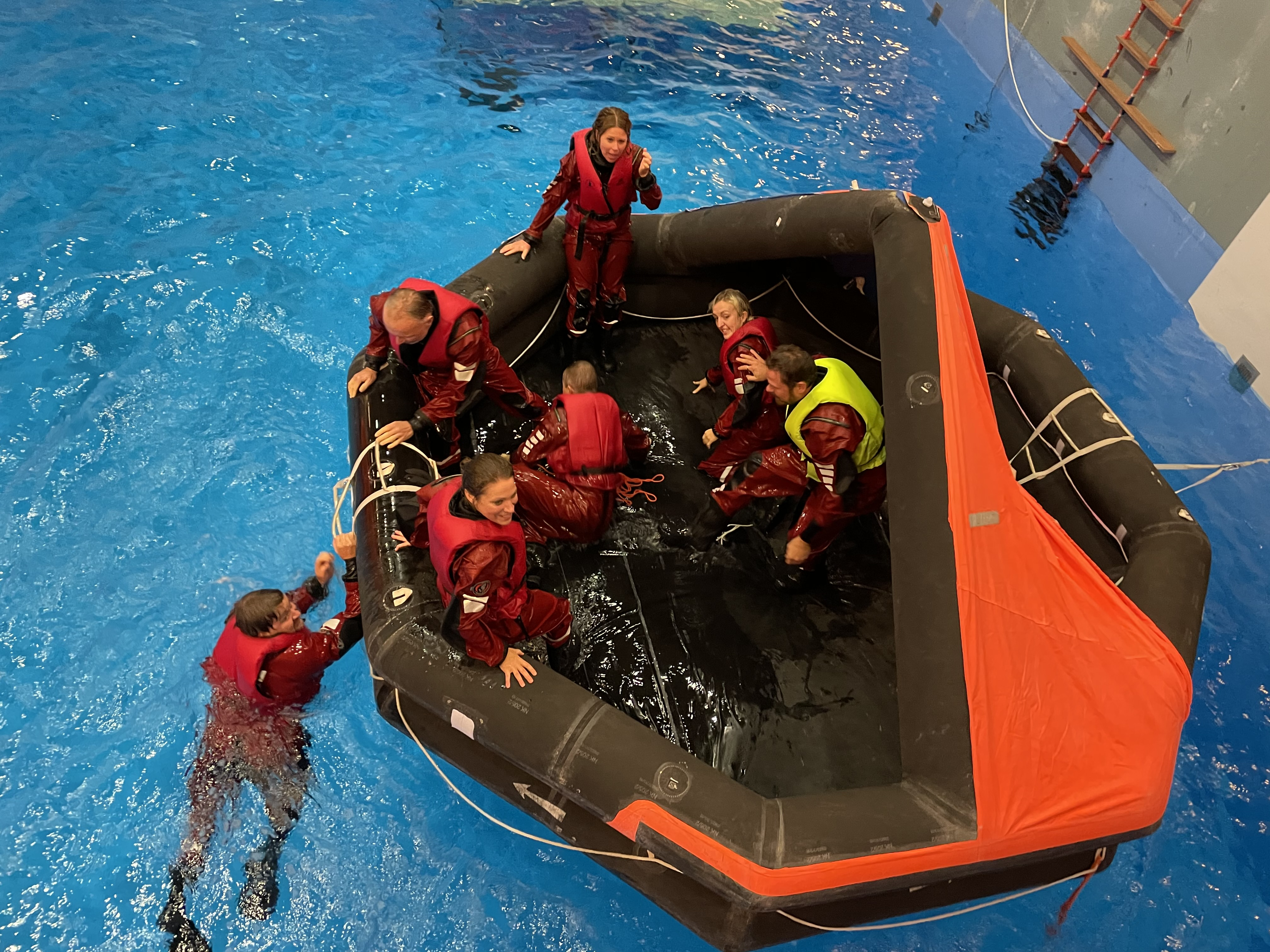
Team building event at Alandica Shipping Academy's training pool

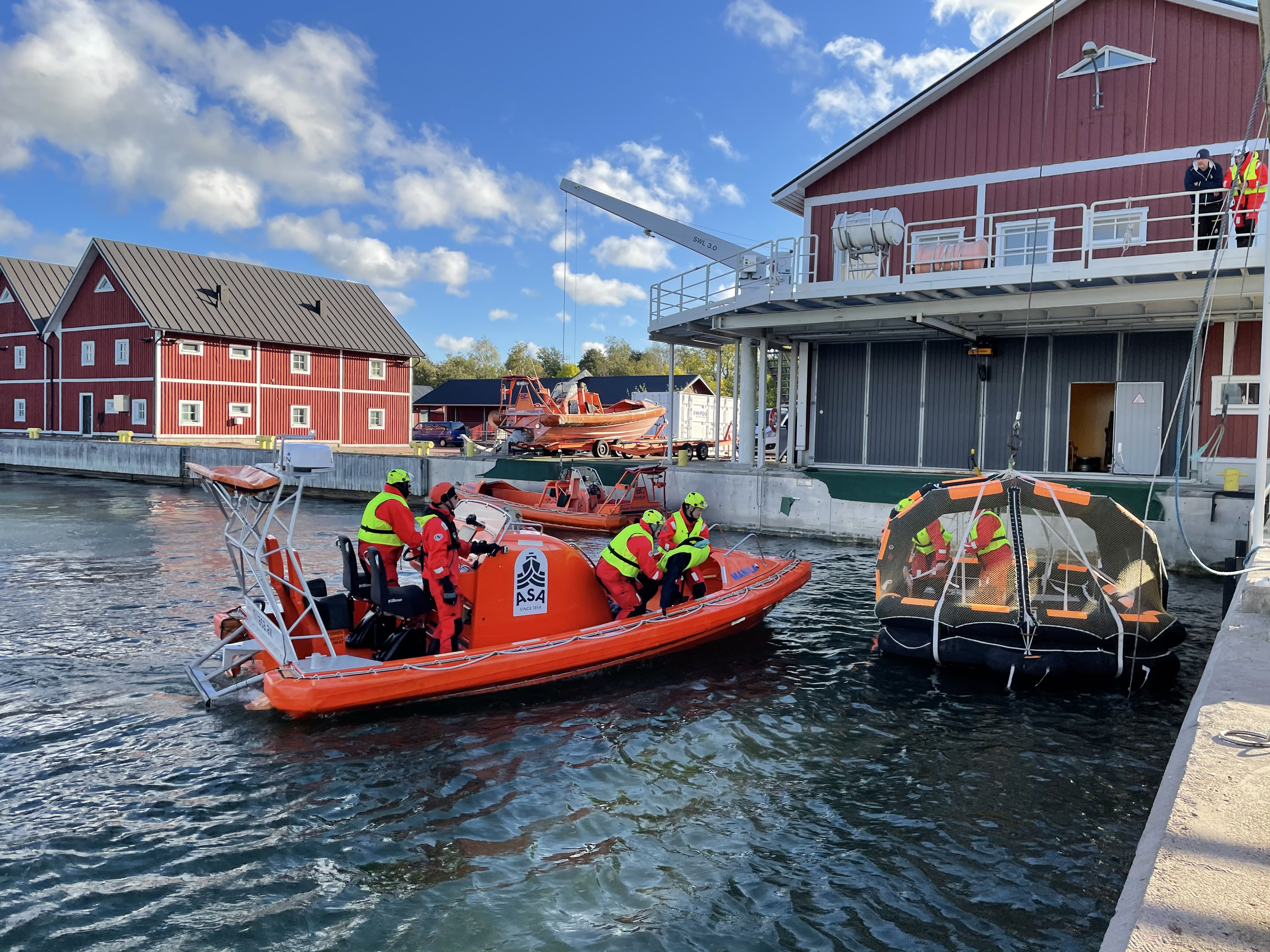
STCW Course: Fast Rescue Boats at Alandica Shipping Academy's harbour
