= NHL Stenden University of Applied Sciences =

University in The Netherlands

Coordinates: 53.2106°N 5.7975°E

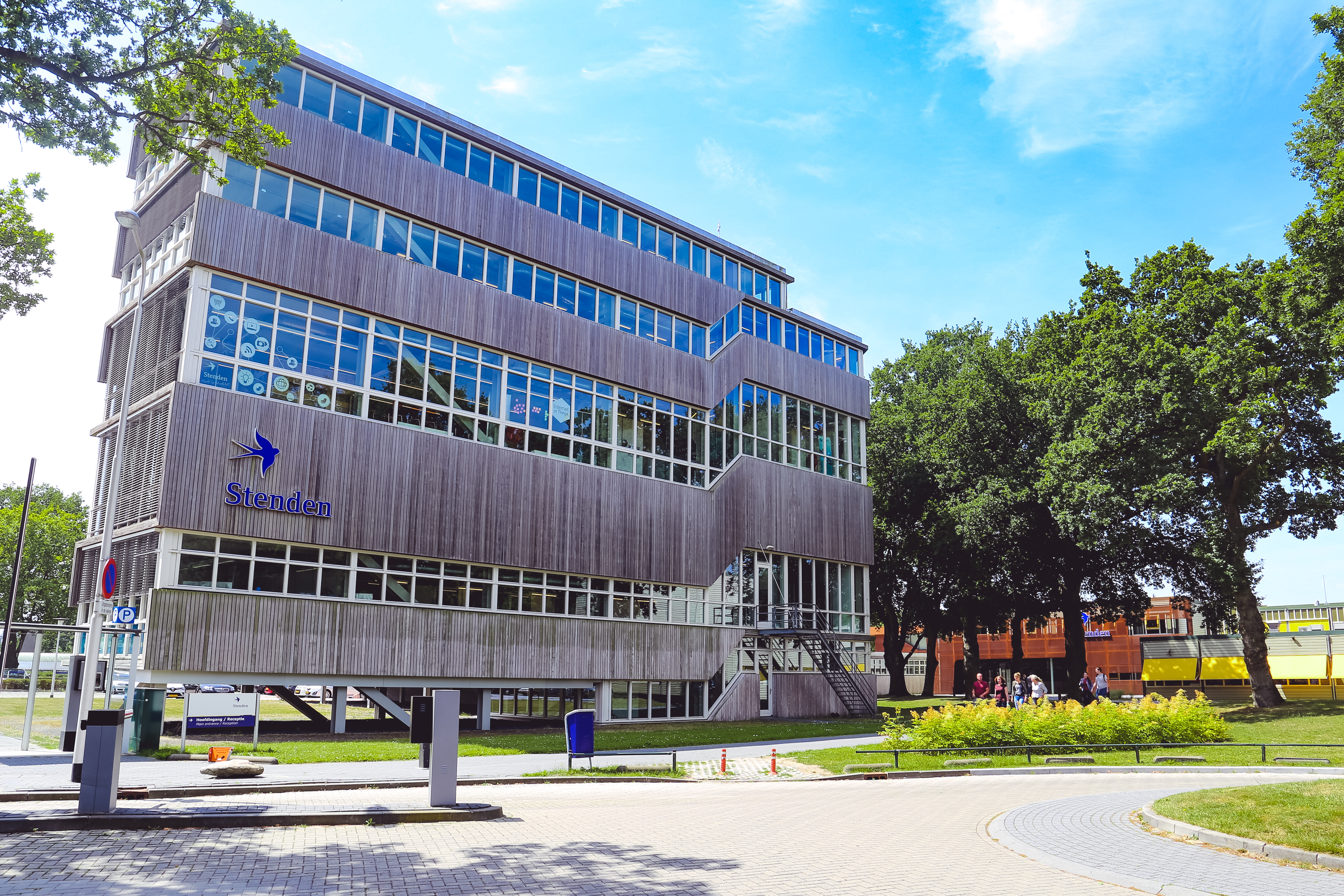

NHL Stenden University of Applied Sciences (Dutch: NHL Stenden Hogeschool) is a state-funded vocational university in the north of the Netherlands. It was formed as a merger of NHL Hogeschool and Stenden Hogeschool in 2018. NHL Stenden University of Applied Sciences has more than 22,000 students from over 100 nationalities.

== Academics ==
NHL Stenden offers 21 associate degrees, 70 bachelor programs and 21 master programs. Programs are offered both in Dutch and English.

The University has four main campuses in the Netherlands. Campuses are located in Leeuwarden, Emmen, Meppel, and Terschelling. Studies are also offered at their Grand Tour partner locations in Indonesia, Thailand, and South Africa.

== See also ==
- Stenden Rangsit University
- Stenden University Qatar
- Stenden South Africa
