= Port Alfred =

- Town
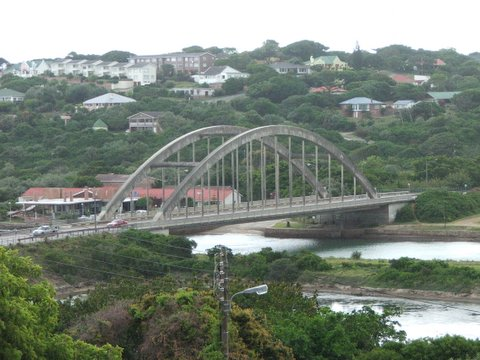
- Bridge in Port Alfred

- Location within Eastern Cape Location within South Africa Location within Africa
- Coordinates: 33°35′30″S 26°53′15″E
- Country: South Africa
- Province: Eastern Cape
- District: Sarah Baartman
- Municipality: Ndlambe

Government
  - Type: Town Council

Area
  - Total: 46.6 km^{2} (18.0 sq mi)

Population (2011)
  - Total: 25,859
  - Density: 555/km^{2} (1,440/sq mi)

Racial makeup (2011)
  - Black African: 80%
  - Coloured: 6.8%
  - Indian/Asian: 0.3%
  - White: 12.5%
  - Other: 0.4%

First languages (2011)
  - Xhosa: 71.2%
  - English: 14.4%
  - Afrikaans: 11.4%
  - Other: 3.1%
- Time zone: UTC+2 (SAST)
- Postal code (street): 6170
- PO box: 6170
- Area code: 046
- Website: www.portalfred.co.za

Port Alfred is a small town with a population of just under 26,000 in the Eastern Cape province of South Africa. It is situated on the eastern seaboard of the country at the mouth of the Kowie River, almost exactly halfway between the larger cities of Gqeberha and East London and 30 kilometres (19 mi) east of Cannon Rocks.

== History ==
Port Alfred was established in the early 1820s by British settlers who were moved into the area by Lord Charles Somerset as there was conflict between the Cape Colony and the Xhosa people. Originally, it was two separate towns (settlers arriving on the west bank in 1820 named their settlement Port Kowie, and those arriving on the east bank named theirs Port Frances).

In 1860, when Queen Victoria's son Prince Alfred visited, the name was changed in his honour.

=== Port ===
In 1839, William Cock and George Hodgkinson started to block the natural river mouth to the east and canalise the present opening to the sea. By 1841 South Africa's first man-made harbour was opened after completion of the stone-lined channel between the ocean and the Kowie river. This allowed high-masted sailing ships with their heavy cargo to dock at the wharf.

== Transport ==
Port Alfred is located on the junction of the R67 and R72 roads. The R67 connects Port Alfred with the N2 at Grahamstown to the north, while the R72 joins the N2 near Colchester to the west and follows the coast to East London in the east.

== Education ==
Educational establishments based in Port Alfred include Stenden South Africa (a subsidiary campus of Stenden University in the Netherlands), a private Christian school (El Shaddai Christian Academy), the largest aviation training school in the Southern Hemisphere (43 Air School), Mtyhobo Primary School, Dambuza Primary School, Nomzamo High School, Kuyasa Combined School and public school, Port Alfred High.
