= Transmogrification =

Transmogrification may refer to:

- Shapeshifting, the ability to physically transform in mythology, folklore and speculative fiction.

== In video games ==
- Transmog, a feature which allows the player to change the appearance of gear, such as weapons and armour, typically to that of functionally equivalent gear.
