= Assassin's Creed Odyssey – Legacy of the First Blade =

- Developer: Ubisoft
- Publisher: Ubisoft
- Composer: The Flight (Note: The collective name of Joe Henson and Alexis Smith)
- Series: Assassin's Creed
- Engine: AnvilNext 2.0
- Platforms: PlayStation 4; Windows; Xbox One; Nintendo Switch; Google Stadia
- Release: Episode 1: Hunted; December 4, 2018; Episode 2: Shadow Heritage; January 15, 2019; Episode 3: Bloodline; March 5, 2019
- Genre: Action role-playing
- Mode: Single-player

Assassin's Creed Odyssey – Legacy of the First Blade is a downloadable content (DLC) pack developed and published by Ubisoft for the 2018 action role-playing video game Assassin's Creed Odyssey. Set both during and after the events of the main story, the pack follows the protagonist of the base game, a legendary Greek mercenary known as the Eagle Bearer, as they face a new threat to the Greek World in the form of the Order of the Ancients, a precursor organisation to the Templar Order, who serve as the perennial antagonists of the Assassin's Creed series. It also explores the history behind the signature Hidden Blade weapon of the Assassin Brotherhood, and how Odyssey is connected to other installments in the Assassin's Creed franchise.

Legacy of the First Blade is the first major downloadable content pack for Assassin's Creed Odyssey. It consists of three episodes: Hunted, Shadow Heritage, and Bloodline, which were released periodically from December 2018 to March 2019 for PlayStation 4, Windows, and Xbox One. Each of the DLC episodes were met with mixed reviews from critics and video game publications. The overall quality and thoughtfulness of the story's writing, as well as its engaging cast of characters, have been praised. However, a pivotal narrative development that sets the player character on a predetermined path to start a family, either out of love or to continue their family bloodline, was poorly received by critics and fans, who felt it betrayed the game's role-playing nature. In response to the controversy, Ubisoft released a patch which made minor adjustments meant to better reflect the nature of the relationship for players who prefer a non-romantic storyline.

== Gameplay ==
Assassin's Creed Odyssey – Legacy of the First Blade is a downloadable content (DLC) pack for the 2018 video game Assassin's Creed Odyssey. The pack is set within the same time period as the base game, namely the Peloponnesian War, an ancient Greek war fought by the Peloponnesian League led by Sparta against the Delian League led by Athens between 431 and 404 BC. The player assumes the role of a legendary Greek misthios (Note: Antiquated term for "mercenary" during the period of Classical Greece) known as the Eagle Bearer. Depending on the player's choice from Odyssey, the Eagle Bearer's identity is either Alexios or Kassandra; they are a pair of siblings descended from a fictionalised version of King Leonidas I of Sparta and the inheritors of his special bloodline.

Legacy of the First Blade was released in episodic format, and features a continuation of the role-playing gameplay elements from Odyssey. The contents of the pack, starting with Hunted, may be accessed by a player character who has reached level 29, and once Episode 7 of the main campaign at the island of Naxos has been completed. Players will encounter non-player characters who require assistance and offer objectives for players to clear as they explore the specific regions featured in Legacy of the First Blade; these typically involve collecting or investigating items of interest, tracking down targets, and killing Order of the Ancients members or their subordinates. The game contains branching dialogue options, which determine how the player character respond to other characters during conversations and cutscenes. The pack grant players access to three new combat abilities in their character's skill tree.

Over the course of the pack's narrative, the player character develops a domestic relationship with a non-player character, whose gender and name depend on the player's choice of character: Neema for Alexios, and Natakas for Kassandra. By the ending of the second episode, Shadow Heritage, they will have a son together regardless of any dialogue options chosen by the player.

== Plot ==
In Hunted, the Eagle Bearer travels to the region of Macedonia and encounters the Persian rebel Darius. Macedonia has been overrun by the Order of the Ancients in their quest to kill Darius, his child, Neema/Natakas, (Note: The identity of Darius' child changes depending on whether the player character is Alexios or Kassandra.) and the Eagle Bearer. The Order considers the Eagle Bearer a "Tainted One" because they believe their bloodline is too powerful and a threat to true peace, and is committing atrocities to draw them out. The Eagle Bearer works with Darius and Neema/Natakas to find and defeat one of the Order's lieutenants, Pactyas "the Huntsman." After mortally wounding him, Pactyas reveals that Darius' real name is Artabanus and claims that he betrayed their pact. Darius then admits that he was once part of a group of freedom fighters alongside Pactyas and their friend Amorges, who worked together to assassinate King Xerxes I of Persia. However, the group disagreed on how to deal with Xerxes' successor, Artaxerxes I; while Darius wanted to kill him, believing he would continue Xerxes' tyrannical policies, Amorges and Pactyas refused to kill an innocent man and ultimately joined the Order to bring true peace to Persia. After his attempt to assassinate Artaxerxes was thwarted by Amorges, Darius was branded a traitor and fled Persia with Neema/Natakas while his remaining family was killed. Knowing the Order will send more men after them, Darius and Neema/Natakas bid farewell to the Eagle Bearer and leave Macedonia to go into hiding once again.

In Shadow Heritage, the Eagle Bearer heads to Achaea and is reunited with Darius and Neema/Natakas. The Order, led by the Tempest, has set up a naval blockade around the region, and is brutalizing Macedonian refugees in a bid to prevent Darius and Neema/Natakas from escaping the Greek world. The Eagle Bearer is able to weaken the Order's power in Achaea by sabotaging the development of a ship-mounted flamethrower and sinking the Tempest's fleet. They are helped in their endeavors by Kleta, the Tempest's mother, who reveals that the Order also consider the Tempest a "Tainted One" and have been using her for their own ends. The Tempest is ultimately killed by the Eagle Bearer, who secures safe passage for the refugees. In the aftermath, Darius and Neema/Natakas decide against leaving, instead settling down with the Eagle Bearer in Achaea. Some time later, the Eagle Bearer has a son, Elpidios, with Neema/Natakas.

An in-game screenshot depicting Darius and a young Elpidios in Ancient Egypt. Through Elpidios, Aya's heritage is traced back to the Eagle Bearer.

In Bloodline, the Eagle Bearer retires from life as a mercenary to spend time with Darius, Neema/Natakas, and Elpidios. However, Amorges and the Order attack their village, killing Neema/Natakas and abducting Elpidios. The Eagle Bearer and Darius travel to Messenia, the Order's stronghold in Greece. They lure Amorges out of hiding by sabotaging the Order's operations in the region, but he refuses to return Elpidios as he believes the Eagle Bearer's violent lifestyle will ultimately harm him. Amorges claims that the Order is not a group of people, but an idea, which can not be vanquished, meaning that the Eagle Bearer and Elpidios will always be targeted. However, Darius states that they can fight this with their own knowledge, and reconciles with Amorges, who reveals Elpidios's location before dying. Admitting that Elpidios will never be safe with them, the Eagle Bearer entrusts Darius to look after his grandson. Darius takes Elpidios to Egypt, where it is revealed that he would become the ancestor to Aya of Alexandria, the wife of Bayek of Siwa and co-founder of the Hidden Ones, a precursor organization to the Assassin Brotherhood.

== Development and release ==
Assassin's Creed Odyssey – Legacy of the First Blade is the first piece of single-player DLC for Assassin's Creed Odyssey. All three episodes were released digitally on PC via Steam and Uplay, PlayStation 4 via PlayStation Network, and Xbox One via Xbox Live between December 4, 2018, and March 5, 2019. The game's season pass allows players access to the individual episodes when they become available.

In response to negative player feedback to the ending of the second episode, Shadow Heritage, Ubisoft released a patch that introduces a modified version of a cutscene played at its ending, and allowed players the option to remind their partner that they agreed to settle down and have a child with them for the practical purpose of continuing their bloodline at the beginning of the third episode, Bloodline. The changes introduced by the patch consisted of the alteration of two spoken lines, the removal of a kiss scene, and the renaming of an achievement/trophy.

== Reception ==
Aggregate review scores
Game	Metacritic
Episode 1: Hunted	(PS4) 67/100
Episode 2: Shadow Heritage	(PS4) 62/100
Episode 3: Bloodline	(PS4) 68/100

All three episodes of Legacy of the First Blade received generally mixed or average reviews on PlayStation 4.

Brandin Tyrrel from IGN noted that Hunted is brief, and its content isolated to a single region with only a handful of assassination targets. Nevertheless, he found it an enjoyable experience as it introduces an intriguing villain, some backstory for its new characters, and sets the stage for a more traditional struggle between the Assassins and the Templars which was mostly missing from the base game. Similarly, he found Shadow Heritage, a naval-focused chapter with a new villain and new tools which "continue pulling at the threads of a larger story", to be familiar but engaging. Tyrrel praised Bloodline for delivering a "a heartfelt storm of emotional payoff, and a great punctuation mark on the three-part story". He praised the new combat skill, Fury of the Bloodline as a fun and useful addition. In summary, he said the conclusion of Bloodline is "a satisfying send off for the many characters introduced, and the Order of the Ancient itself", and provides necessary clarity for the base game's place in the overall franchise lore "more clearly than ever before".

Robert Ramsey from Push Square said Hunted is a "solid starting point for what could turn out to be an interesting story" and recommends it for fans of the base game, summarizing that though the pack introduces no new gameplay variation, it provides a "well made slice of open world adventuring, complete with some thoughtful character moments". Ramsey assessed Shadow Heritage to be an improvement over Hunted due to its more engaging quests and superior character interactions, though he acknowledged that its "forced ending" is undeniably disappointing since the game has a tendency to promote player choice as a pivotal part of the experience. Bloodline on the other hand, provided a "convenient but still emotional conclusion" and enriches the base game as a "tale of love and loss" for Ramsey, who felt that the pack has done admirably in showcasing a hero "who, even after all of their adventures, is still just looking for a purpose". He concluded that Legacy of the First Blade "stands as a fine addition to an already great game".

Colin Campbell from Polygon, who played as Kassandra, praised Hunted for offering moral introspection over questions about the nature of free will and “goodness”, and that for "a short time, it threatens to say something vital about games, heroism and violence", which he interpreted as "a good sign for the future of this form of entertainment, and as a frustrating demonstration of its present limitations". However, he severely criticised the ending of Shadow Heritage as "one of the worst betrayals of a fictional character" that he could recall, as in his view the developers had diminished a character they spent much time and effort creating, effectively turning Kassandra "into a cutout for a hackneyed plot" since she settles down to the life of a housewife and mother. In his review of Bloodlines, Campbell formed the view that it failed to renew his desire to spend any further time with Odyssey; he expressed a deep disappointment that Kassandra's legacy is to provide "the matriarchal line to subsequent assassins", as her story is essentially lost to history as presented within the narrative of Odyssey. Similarly, the pack's antagonists failed to resonate with him, as to him their noble cause and reasonably articulated motivations is "thinly veiled fascism, held up as an affront to Kassandra’s own quest for messy democratic ideals".

=== Controversy ===
A compulsory plot development where the player character settles down with Darius' child and starts a family by the ending of Shadow Heritage has attracted controversy. Some players, particularly LGBTQ individuals, complained that they were given no say over the narrative decision to hard-wire the protagonist character into a heterosexual relationship which conceived a child, even though some players previously took their characters into same-sex romances. This was in contradiction to previous comments from creative director Jonathan Dumont where he explained that the choice-driven nature of Odyssey's story allows players to build the relationships they want without being forced into romantic situations which they may not be comfortable with. As a result, some commentators observed that the role-playing aspects which were emphasised by Ubisoft for Odyssey were invalidated, and that an individual player's roleplay style and control over their character's identity were not respected.

Ubisoft later issued a statement in response to the controversy, and explained that they "strive to give players choice whenever possible in Odyssey and apologize to those surprised by the events in this episode". A patch which slightly modified the contents of the cutscene was released soon afterwards.
