= The Misunderstanding =

1943 play by Albert Camus

First edition (publ. Gallimard NRF)

The Misunderstanding (French: Le Malentendu), sometimes published as Cross Purpose, is a play written in 1943 in occupied France by Albert Camus. It focuses on Camus's idea of the Absurd.

A man who has been living overseas for many years returns home to find his sister and widowed mother are making a living by taking in lodgers and murdering them. Since neither his sister nor his mother recognize him, he becomes a lodger himself without revealing his identity.

== Plot summary ==
=== Act 1: The reception hall of a small boarding house ===
Martha and her Mother, together with a taciturn Old Man, run a guest-house in which they murder rich solitary travellers. Martha wants to get enough money to go and live by the sea. Mother is exhausted by killing.

Jan returns to the house he left 20 years ago. He has heard his father was dead and has returned with money for his mother. He expected to be welcomed as the prodigal son, but his mother does not recognise him. His wife Maria says a normal person would simply introduce himself, but Jan intends to observe his family from the outside and find what they really need to make them happy. Maria reluctantly agrees to leave him there for one night.

Jan registers under a false name. Martha is cold and refuses to answer personal questions. Mother fails to respond when Jan hints at his purpose in coming and asks if she had a son, but she begs Martha not to kill him.

=== Act 2: The bedroom, evening ===
Martha warms slightly towards Jan, but when he becomes interested in her she rejects the shared moment and determines to kill him. She brings him a drugged cup of tea. Mother tries to retrieve the tea but is too late. Jan tries to express his feelings to her, but Mother replies impersonally. When Jan falls asleep, Martha takes his money and they prepare to throw him in the river.

=== Act 3: The reception hall, morning ===
In the morning, Martha is happy but Mother just feels tired. The Old Man finds Jan's dropped passport and they realise without emotion what they have done. Mother decides to drown herself, disregarding Martha's protests. Martha is left alone with her anger.

Maria arrives, looking for her husband. Martha first says he has left, but then admits they drugged and drowned him for his money, saying it was "a slight misunderstanding" that led her to kill her own brother. Maria is distraught. Martha coldly compares it to her own loss of her mother. Then realising she is alone she decides to kill herself. She tells Maria to pray God turns her to stone or kill herself too, then leaves the house. Maria prays for mercy and the Old Man appears. Maria asks for help but he bluntly refuses.

== Origin ==
Camus wrote Le Malentendu in 1942 and 1943 in Le Chambon-sur-Lignon in Nazi-occupied France. Originally the play was to have been entitled Budejovice after the city České Budějovice in Czechoslovakia where Camus stayed briefly during a European trip with his first wife in 1936.

The play "is a highly subjective presentation by Camus of the human condition as he saw it in the desperate circumstances of 1942-43". It reflects several aspects of Camus's life: he had left Algeria, to which he was deeply attached, leaving his second wife and friends behind; he was depressed with tuberculosis; as well as living under threat of execution as a propaganda agent of the French Resistance. Camus once described Le Malentendu as "the play that resembles me the most".

The plot of Le Malentendu resembles the newspaper article that the protagonist of Camus' 1942 novel The Stranger finds under his mattress in his prison cell: it is the story of a man who became rich abroad and comes home to his village where his sister and mother have a hotel. He doesn't reveal his identity (in order to surprise them later), and books a room as a guest. Because he is wealthy, his mother and sister murder him while he is asleep.

The plot is also an ironic reversal of the classical theme of the recognition of the brother, from the ancient Greek Electra plays and the New Testament story of the Prodigal Son.

== Style ==
Le Malentendu "is austere in its plot and characterization and claustrophobic in mood".

Camus "deliberately contrived an effect of polished, articulate, non-colloquial discourse", as in a classical tragedy. Through the necessity of writing while under occupation, "the play is cloaked in metaphor, trailing a train of symbols, with Camus styling the drama with all the inevitability of a Greek tragedy. In the Greek style, each character gives the argument for his or her actions, whether for good or ill. Thus Camus is able to air his thoughts on innocence, grief, guilt, betrayal, punishment, integrity, and silence, wrapping all these in what is essentially an existential debate. Although Camus' arguments come thick and fast, the play moves at a deliberate pace as it develops into more of a treatise than an organic drama".

"It is the most poetic of all the works Camus wrote for the stage, but one cannot claim that speech and situation always match perfectly".

The characters "unwittingly express ambiguities that escape their awareness", and indirectly express philosophical ideas. Le Malentendu is "so heavily laden with ambiguities and multiple levels of meaning that it borders on caricature, a fact that may explain its relative failure as a tragedy".

== Themes ==
Camus's theme is "the sauveur manqué, a savior who fails because of his inability to speak a clear language to those he would save".

Le Malentendu "depicts the destruction of a family fatally incapable of communicating with each other". Jan does not heed his wife Maria when she advises him to introduce himself plainly. His sister Martha accepts nothing but impersonal communication. Mother is too weary to respond to Jan's hints.

The play contrasts the love between Jan and his wife with the absence of love from his sister and mother. Mother's suicide when she realises her crime deprives Martha of the maternal love she also needs. Maria's wish for divine love is also denied.

"One of the most important themes is the impossibility of attaining happiness". Despite the success of his marriage, Jan cannot be happy in exile, but wishes to return to his family and be happy together. Martha also longs to be somewhere else, and Mother longs for peace, but these desires are only met in death.

The misunderstandings and lack of comprehension that thwart these desires illustrate Camus' philosophy of the Absurd. These difficulties create the drama – Jan's choice to conceal his identity, Martha's insistence on impersonal conventions, her misinterpretation of his determination to stay, Maria's bewildered response to her cold confession, and the Old Man's indifference.

When Camus revised the play in 1958, he added or modified four very short incidents to transform the indifference of the Old Man into something more sinister. For example, he distracts Martha when she is about to check Jan's passport. Camus aimed to "intensify the effect of unrelieved metaphysical blackness, culminating in the very last crushing syllable of the play: 'Non!"".

The play expresses an antipathy to religion, but also a strong concern with religious ideas, including the parable of the prodigal son. "Camus had never cut himself off from conversation with Christian thinkers but stood in a relation of tension to Christianity".

The return of Jan from happiness in Africa to a murderous home, and the yearning of Martha to be in the sun, reflect an antithesis between Northern Europe and the Mediterranean, which informs all of Camus' work.

== Philosophy ==
"The vision is bleak, with Camus' absurdist creed summed up by one of his characters: 'This world we live in doesn't make sense'"

Le Malentendu "focused on Camus' idea of the absurd. The core of this idea is that human desire is in perpetual conflict with a world that is arbitrary, illogical and unfair. A central theme of this play is that life does not distinguish between those who pursue a 'bad' path and those who pursue a 'good' path. Life, as Camus sees it, is equally cruel to the innocent and the criminal; this is the absurdity of existence"

"In The Myth of Sysiphus, Camus defines 'The Absurd' … as the feeling of being radically divorced from the world and thus a stranger to both others and oneself. The sense of constantly living in a state of exile produces a profound skepticism or distrust in the myths and universal systems of belief, which are alleged to give meaning and purpose to existence but in fact devalue and even negate it"

"Although seen by a number of critics as a bleak piece of work, Camus did not regard Le Malentendu as pessimistic. He said: 'When the tragedy is done, it would be incorrect to think that this play argues for submission to fate. On the contrary, it is a play of revolt, perhaps even containing a moral of sincerity'" It implies that everything would have worked out all right if Jan had done what his wife begged him to do, or if Martha had responded to Jan's personal questions or Mother had remembered when asked about her son. The family is destroyed through "failing to realise that values are not dreamed up in isolation but discovered communally".

"Camus himself remarked that he considered the play to have been a failure for the simple reason that everybody he met kept asking him what he meant. If they needed to ask, he argued, then the play itself was not clear, and he had not been successful as a playwright".

== Performance history ==
Le Malentendu was staged for the first time at the Théâtre de Mathurins in Paris on 24 August 1944, directed by Marcel Herrand, who also played the part of Jan and with Maria Casarès as Martha. The performance coincided with the Liberation of Paris. The play had two short runs, neither particularly successful. It was the first of Camus' plays to be performed, although Caligula had been written two years earlier.

"The French public were ill-prepared in 1945 to appreciate such multi-faceted allegories and such philosophical implications in the absence of rational cogency and psychological realism. In a word, the play was felt to be lacking in logic. Its tragic tone, its refinement, its poetic presentation were no compensation to the audience which insisted – particularly in those days – on clarity of statement and precision of thought".

In 2012, a production of Cross Purpose, was performed in English at the King's Head Theatre, London. Produced by AM Media Productions, Jamie Birkett starred as Martha with Christina Thornton as Mother, David Lomax as Jan, Melissanthi Mahut as Maria and Leonard Fenton as the Old Man. The production was revived in 2013 with Paddy Navin as Mother and Kemi-Bo Jacobs as Maria.
