= Melissanthi Mahut =

Canadian-Greek actress (born 1988)

- Born: September 20, 1988 (age 37); Toronto, Ontario, Canada
- Citizenship: Canada; Greece
- Education: National Theatre of Greece Drama School; Royal Academy of Dramatic Art
- Occupation: Actress
- Years active: 2010–present

Melissanthi Mahut (Greek: Μελισσάνθη Μαχούτ; born September 20, 1988) is a Canadian-Greek actress. She is known for her role as Kassandra in Assassin's Creed Odyssey, and for playing Mita Xenakis in the Netflix film Eurovision Song Contest: The Story of Fire Saga.

== Early life and education ==
Mahut was born in Toronto, Ontario and raised in Greece. Her father is Quebecois, while her mother is Greek. She attended the National Theatre of Greece Drama School and later went on to study at the Royal Academy of Dramatic Art (RADA). She graduated from RADA with a BA degree in Acting in 2012.

== Career ==
Mahut’s career started in Greece where she starred in theatre productions as well as in short and feature films such as Mythopathy (Νοτιάς), The Taste of Love (Η Γεύση της Αγάπης).

In 2017 she landed the role of Kassandra in the video game Assassin's Creed Odyssey for which she received widespread critical acclaim as well as global recognition for her performance including a nomination for the BAFTA Games Awards, the D.I.C.E. Awards, and The Game Awards.

In 2020 she appeared as the Greek Eurovision contestant Mita Xenakis in the Netflix film Eurovision Song Contest: The Story of Fire Saga alongside Will Ferrell, Rachel McAdams and Dan Stevens. The film was scheduled for a May 2020 release, but due to COVID-19 was postponed to June 26. In 2020 Mahut voiced the character of Athena in the video game Immortals Fenyx Rising. She had a recurring role in two parts of the Greek anthology series The Other Me (Έτερος Εγώ) based on the 2016 Greek crime thriller of the same name. In 2022 she starred in a standalone episode of the Greek TV series Kart Postal.

In 2022, Mahut played Calliope in the eleventh episode of the Netflix production of Neil Gaiman's The Sandman. It is an adaptation of the comic book series of the same name, created by Gaiman and published by Vertigo/DC Comics, and in 2023 she had a small role in the American sci-fi/action film Meg 2: The Trench, where she played the role of Rigas, a security officer. She reprised her role as Calliope in two episodes of the second season of The Sandman.

== Filmography ==
Film and television roles
Year	Title	Role	Notes
2010	Artherapy	Herself	Film
2014	In Transit	Tina	Film
2015	Worlds Apart	Employee	Film
2016	Mythopathy	Betty	Film
2016	Luna Bar	Crazy girl	Film
2018	The Taste of Love	Pavlina	Television film
2019	The Other Me: Lost Souls	Tonia	TV series
2020	Eurovision Song Contest: The Story of Fire Saga	Mita Xenakis	Streaming film
2020	The Other Me: Catharsis	Tonia	Main role
2022	Kart Postal	Sophia	Episode: "Κnow Thyself"
2022 - 25	The Sandman	Calliope	Season 1 Episode: "A Dream of a Thousand Cats" / "Calliope", Season 2 Episodes: "The Song of Orpheus" and "A Tale of Graceful Ends"
2023	Meg 2: The Trench	Rigas	Film
2024	The Turkish Detective	Lina	TV series

Video game roles
Year	Title	Role
2017	Assassin's Creed Origins	Various Characters
2018	Assassin's Creed Odyssey	Kassandra
2019	Discovery Tour: Ancient Greece	Kassandra
2020	Immortals Fenyx Rising	Athena
2021	Assassin's Creed Valhalla	Kassandra
2023	Assassin's Creed Nexus VR	Kassandra

== Stage ==
Year	Play	Role	Theatre
2012	The Misunderstanding	Maria	Kings Head Theatre
2013–2015	The House of Bernarda Alba	Adela	The Vault Theatre
2015–2016	Crime and Punishment	Sonya	National Theatre of Greece
2016–2017	Metropolis	Medea/Messenger	Small Theatre of Epidaurus

== Accolades ==
Year	Work	Award	Category	Result	Ref
2018	Assassin's Creed Odyssey	The Game Awards	Best Performance	Nominated	
2018	Assassin's Creed Odyssey	Gamers' Choice Awards	Fan Favourite Female Voice Actor	Nominated	
2018	Assassin's Creed Odyssey	D.I.C.E. Awards	Outstanding Achievement in Character	Nominated	
2018	Assassin's Creed Odyssey	BAFTA Game Awards	Performer	Nominated	
