= Assassin's Creed Odyssey =

2018 video game

- Developer: Ubisoft Quebec
- Publisher: Ubisoft
- Directors: Jonathan Dumont; Scott Phillips
- Producer: Marc-Alexis Côté
- Designers: Jordane Thiboust; Julien Galloudec
- Artist: Thierry Dansereau
- Writers: Jonathan Dumont; Melissa MacCoubrey; Hugo Giard
- Composer: The Flight
- Series: Assassin's Creed
- Engine: AnvilNext 2.0
- Platforms: PlayStation 4; Windows; Xbox One; Nintendo Switch; Stadia
- Release: October 5, 2018: PlayStation 4, Windows, Xbox One; WW: October 5, 2018 Nintendo Switch; JP: October 5, 2018 Stadia; WW: November 19, 2019
- Genre: Action role-playing
- Mode: Single-player

Assassin's Creed Odyssey is a 2018 action role-playing game developed by Ubisoft Quebec and published by Ubisoft. It is the eleventh major installment in the Assassin's Creed series and the successor to Assassin's Creed Origins (2017). Like its predecessor, the game features a large open world and adopts many elements from the role-playing genre, putting more emphasis on combat and exploration than stealth. Naval combat from previous titles in the series also plays a prominent role in Odyssey. The game's plot tells a mythological history of the Peloponnesian War between Athens and Sparta from 431 to 422 BCE. Players control a Spartan mercenary, who fights on both sides of the conflict as they attempt to find their family and eliminate the mysterious Cult of Kosmos. Odyssey also continues the story arc of Layla Hassan, who relives the mercenary's memories through the Animus device to find a powerful artifact.

Development of the game commenced shortly following the release of Assassin's Creed Syndicate (2015). Following in the footsteps of Origins, Odyssey facilitated the transition of Assassin's Creed into a series of action role-playing games by introducing player-choice mechanics. Compared with other games in the series, Odyssey has a larger focus on historical mythology, and a smaller focus on the conflict between the Assassins and Templars, which is the central narrative element present in most Assassin's Creed games. Throughout the game's development, the team was inspired by other contemporaneous RPG titles including The Witcher 3: Wild Hunt, The Elder Scrolls V: Skyrim, and Fallout 4. The music of the game was composed by The Flight.

Odyssey was released worldwide for PlayStation 4, Windows, and Xbox One on October 5, 2018. It received generally positive reviews from critics, with praise for its gameplay, graphics, characters, role-playing elements, and world design, but was criticised for its over-ambition, pacing, and the inclusion of microtransactions. The prioritization of role-playing mechanics over traditional Assassin's Creed elements also drew a mixed response from critics and players. Odyssey was a commercial success, selling over 10 million copies worldwide by March 2020.

Ubisoft supported the game with several releases of downloadable content, including two story expansions—Legacy of the First Blade and The Fate of Atlantis. Odyssey was followed in November 2020 by Assassin's Creed Valhalla, which features a historical setting in medieval England and Norway during the Viking expansion across Europe and which concludes Layla's story arc.

== Gameplay ==
Assassin's Creed Odyssey is an action role-playing video game played from a third-person perspective. At the beginning of the game, the player can select to play as either Alexios or Kassandra, Greek mercenaries and descendants of the Spartan king Leonidas I. In addition to completing the story campaign, players can freely explore a large open world set in Greece on foot, boat, or on horseback. As the player explores the world, they will encounter various non-playable characters (NPCs) who give players side missions to complete. They also discover locations of interests, clear out fortresses and camps, explore tombs and shipwrecks, and collect hidden treasures. Synchronization points in various landmarks in Greece, which serve as fast travel points, can also be unlocked. Players can also collect special collectibles and various crafting resources, such as iron ore, wood, leather, metal, and precious gems, through exploration and hunting wildlife. Other side activities players can undertake include competing in a gladiatorial arena and completing time-limited bounties and contracts. Unlike the previous games in the series, Odyssey offers two modes of gameplay: Guided mode shows the player the locations of their objects immediately using waypoints, while Exploration mode tasks players to find out the locations themselves after being given brief clues from other NPCs.

In Odyssey, the player can participate in conquest battles and fight for either the Athenians or the Spartans.

While the main campaign missions follow the mercenary as they reunite their family and stop the Cult of Kosmos, additional questlines task the players to defeat mystical creatures from Atlantis and take down cultists. As the game is set during the Peloponnesian War, Athens and Sparta control various parts of Greece. An area can be weakened if the player assassinates the nation leader, defeats members of their army, burns down war supplies, or pillages their nation chests. When a region is weakened, players can join a conquest battle to aid either the attacking or the defending side. Winning a battle will earn the player valuable loot, gear and experience points. Joining the attacking team is a more challenging experience but it will offer more gameplay benefits. A bounty is placed on the player character if they commit a crime such as stealing or hurting an innocent bystander in public. NPCs called Mercenaries will then arrive to hunt the player character, who can either kill the mercenary, pay the bounty, or assassinate the character who placed the bounty on them. Each area has a recommended level. The player may be easily overpowered if they venture into an area too early. However, the game's difficulty is scaled in accordance to the player's level. When interacting with other NPCs, players can select various dialogue options, including the option to develop a romantic relationship with particular NPCs. At key moments of the game's campaign, players make crucial decisions which can affect the course of the story and lead to several different endings.

=== Combat ===
There are two modes of melee attack—light attacks are fast but weak, while heavy attacks are slow but strong. Players can also dodge enemy attacks, or parry them. The player character can use different types of melee weapons such as spears, heavy blunt weapons, daggers, swords, and bows and arrows to defeat enemies. The player may choose to equip armour, boots, helmets and gloves. The game features a weapon and gear system in which each weapon and piece of armour the player wears has different statistics and effects which provide a range of advantages. These can be equipped and upgraded individually, with additional gameplay benefits imbued into the weapons through engraving. The strength and power of these weapons depend on their level as well as their rarity. The rarer the weapon, the more powerful it is, and the cost of upgrading it scales to its level. The player character also commandeers a warship named Adrestia to explore the Aegean Sea. Players can launch arrows and javelins against hostile ships, cleave opponent ships directly, and command the crew to brace when they are attacked. When the health of enemy ship is nearly depleted, the player character can initiate naval boarding. Successful boarding provides the player with additional resources and restores the health of the Adrestia. The ship is upgradable; the player can improve the strength of the hull, boost the stamina of the rowers and customize their crew. While the player is exploring the sea, they may encounter Alpha ships, which are essentially enemy bosses that the players can defeat, as well as other mercenaries if the player's bounty is high enough.

Stealth and open combat are equally viable choices for completing objectives. The player can use Leonidas' spear to silently assassinate enemies, or knock them out in order to recruit them to join the player's crew. The bodies of incapacitated enemies can be hidden to avoid alerting other enemies. The player can also call Ikaros, a golden eagle companion, to scout an area by highlighting enemies and objects. The player character also has the ability to draw an enemy's attention by whistling. As with other Assassin's Creed games, the player character is an expert in free running and can climb nearly all structures. As the player completes quests, they earn additional experience points (XP), which allows the player to unlock new skills and abilities. The three skill trees are "hunter," which focuses on ranged attacks through the use of a bow & arrow, "warrior," which focuses on weapons-based combat, and "assassin," which focuses on stealth and silent take-downs. Examples of the skills the player can unlock include "Spartan Kick", which can knock an enemy back, and "Rush Assassination", which allows the mercenary to throw Leonidas' spear from afar against enemies. Some skills have a cooldown time, and others can only be used when the player's adrenaline bar fills up. This can be achieved by inflicting damage or dodging and parring attacks.

== Synopsis ==
=== Setting and characters ===
As with previous games in the series, Odyssey features a narrative set in the modern-day, which follows Layla Hassan, an Assassin and former Abstergo researcher who was introduced in Origins. Assisted by fellow Assassins Victoria Bibeau, Kiyoshi Takakura, and Alannah Ryan, Layla's goal is to find the Staff of Hermes Trismegistus and the lost city of Atlantis by using data processed by her portable Animus device. The device recounts a secret mythological history set during the Peloponnesian War, which was fought between the city-states of Greece. The game's historical plot is set in 431–422 BC, four centuries before the events of Assassin's Creed Origins and the creation of the Hidden Ones, the forerunners to the Brotherhood of Assassins.

The game's main storyline follows the player character, the elder of two siblings known as the Eagle Bearer, a legendary mercenary with Ikaros as a constant companion. As a child, the Eagle Bearer was exiled from Spartan society after they attempted to stop a Spartan elder from throwing their younger, infant sibling from Mount Taygetos at the urging of the Pythia, who determined that the child, if allowed to live, would be responsible for the potential glory or downfall of Sparta. As punishment for inadvertently sending the Spartan elder falling to his death, they were thrown off the mountain by their father Nikolaos, who was compelled to do so by the Spartan leadership. They survived the fall and ended up in the care of a con man named Markos, based in Kephallonia, where they work various odd jobs under his direction. As a wandering mercenary or misthios, the Eagle Bearer has opportunities to fight for both the Delian League, led by Athens, and the Peloponnesian League, led by Sparta. In conjunction with the Eagle Bearer's attempts to reunite their fractured family, parallel quest lines deal with the destruction of the Cult of Kosmos (a secret organization spanning the Greek world) and the discovery of artifacts and monsters from Atlantean times.

The game features a number of historical personages players can encounter and interact with, including Alkibiades, Aristophanes, Euripides, Democritus, Sokrates and many others. It also includes historical and mythical Greek locations such as the Agora of Athens, the statue of Zeus at Olympia, Lesbos, and Macedonia. The game features several creatures from Greek mythology, such as Medusa, the Cyclops, the Sphinx, and the Minotaur, depicted here as experiments of the Isu, the same race that created humanity and most of the artifacts encountered throughout the series.

=== Plot ===
Odyssey's story begins in 480 BC, where King Leonidas leads the Spartan army against a Persian charge during the Battle of Thermopylae. The skirmish is won, but a captured enemy informs Leonidas that the Persian army has learned of the mountain path and will surround the Spartans by morning. Nevertheless, Leonidas resolves to hold off the Persian advance.

In 2018, Layla Hassan recovers Leonidas' spear. She extracts the DNA of his grandchildren, Alexios and Kassandra, from it to use in her Animus to find the location of the Staff of Hermes Trismegistus. Whichever sibling is selected by the player is designated as the Eagle Bearer. (Note: Within the series' lore, Kassandra is designated as the canon Eagle Bearer, appearing as such in Odyssey's novelization and later reconfirmed in Odyssey's successor, Assassin's Creed Valhalla, in which Kassandra appears as a guest character as part of a bonus questline added after the game's release.)

In 431 BC, at the onset of the Peloponnesian War, the Eagle Bearer is hired by a mysterious merchant named Elpenor. The plot is to assassinate the "Wolf of Sparta" in the city of Megaris. After befriending a naval captain named Barnabas, the Eagle Bearer leaves Kephallonia having been given command of his ship, the Adrestia. In Megaris, the Eagle Bearer learns that Nikolaos is not their biological father and has another adopted son, Stentor. They also learn that their mother Myrinne left Nikolaos and Sparta shortly after the incident at Mount Taygetos. The Eagle Bearer travels to Phokis to confront Elpenor, who reveals himself to be a member of the Cult of Kosmos, who are aware of their lineage. Disguised in Elpenor's mask and robes after killing him, the Eagle Bearer infiltrates a secret Cult meeting in Delphi, where they discover that not only is the Cult targeting their family, but their younger sibling had survived the fall from Mount Taygetos and subsequently manipulated by the Cult into becoming their champion known as Deimos. Accompanied by Barnabas and Herodotos, the Eagle Bearer embarks on an extended journey across the Greek world. Eventually they reunite with Myrinne, who had assumed the alias of Phoenix, the oligarch of the polis of Naxos. Myrinne persuades her eldest child to convince the Spartan regime to reinstate their citizenship and ancestral estate, while they continue to undermine the Cult's activities in the Greek world together.

At the Battle of Pylos, The Eagle Bearer meets Deimos. The encounter leads to a fight which results in The Eagle Bearer's capture. They are taken to Athens, where the Cultist Kleon enjoys popularity as leader of the city-state following the death of his rival Perikles years prior. Thwarting Kleon's plans, The Eagle Bearer escapes captivity with the help of their Athenian allies. At the Battle of Amphipolis, The Eagle Bearer joins Brasidas' Spartan forces to confront Kleon's Athenian army. During the battle, the leaders of both armies die, ushering in the end of the first half of the Peloponnesian War. Afterwards, the Eagle Bearer returns with Myrinne to Mount Taygetos to confront Deimos. Depending on key decisions made by the player at predetermined points of the game's narrative, the Eagle Bearer either redeems or kills Deimos. Their actions have a direct bearing on the fates of their extended family members and determines whether they will have a successful family reunion for the main plotline's epilogue.

After eliminating the Cult, the Eagle Bearer returns to the sanctuary in Delphi, where they find the Cult's pyramid-shaped artifact and Aspasia, who reveals herself to be the Cult's original leader. Disgusted by what the Cult had become as a result of Deimos' influence, Aspasia secretly helps the Eagle Bearer dismantle it, with hope that its original ideals of peace through order may survive. The Eagle Bearer touches the artifact and receives visions of future conflicts. They then destroy it and decides Aspasia's fate. At some point during their lifetime, the Eagle Bearer also meets their biological father Pythagoras, who is revealed to be a descendant of the Isu like Myrinne and Leonidas, and inherits the Staff of Hermes from Pythagoras to safeguard the secrets of Atlantis, gaining biological immortality in the process.

In the present, Layla encounters the Eagle Bearer in Atlantis, who warns her that the world needs balance between the Assassins' and Templars' ideals; either side prevailing over the other will result in the world's doom. Layla also learns that she is the prophesied one who will bring balance between the concepts of chaos and order. The Eagle Bearer gives Layla the Staff before dying.

=== Legacy of the First Blade ===
Set during the events of the main campaign, this expansion focuses on the Eagle Bearer's conflict with the Order of the Ancients, the precursor organization to the Templar Order introduced in Assassin's Creed Origins. The Order is hunting the Eagle Bearer in an attempt to end their bloodline, which they believe is too powerful and a threat to their vision of peace. In fighting against the Order, the Eagle Bearer receives aid from Darius, a character first mentioned in Assassin's Creed II, who is also being pursued by the Order due to his history with them. A major plot element in the expansion concerns the Eagle Bearer's desire to settle down and start a family.

=== The Fate of Atlantis ===
In 422 BC, after inheriting the Staff of Hermes from Pythagoras, the Eagle Bearer meets the Isu Aletheia, whose consciousness is stored inside the Staff. Aletheia explains that their duty as the Keeper of the Staff is to help the "Heir of Memories" unlock the gate to Atlantis by finding three tombs with symbols required to open the gate. The Eagle Bearer locates the tombs, allowing Layla to find the symbols in the present. She then relives a memory of Deimos to learn the correct order to activate them, allowing her to access Atlantis.

After being joined by Victoria, Layla is informed by Aletheia that she created simulations to help the Eagle Bearer master the Staff's powers. Layla enters the Animus to relive the Eagle Bearer's memories of the simulations and learn how to wield the Staff.

In the simulation of Elysium, the Eagle Bearer meets Persephone, the strict ruler of Elysium, and learns of a human rebellion led by Adonis against her regime. The Eagle Bearer helps both sides of the conflict while also meeting and assisting Hermes Trismegistus, who offers to teach them about the Staff, and Hekate, who secretly seeks to undermine Persephone's rule and take over Elysium. The Eagle Bearer eventually helps Adonis and his rebels to attack Persephone's palace, where they defeat Hermes in combat and confront the ruler. Depending on choices made by the player, Persephone either allows Adonis to leave Elysium or blinds him, before banishing the Eagle Bearer to the Underworld.

In the Underworld simulation, the Eagle Bearer is forced to defeat Cerberus before being confronted by Hades. He explains that Cerberus' death has opened numerous rifts between Tartaros and the Underworld, releasing souls confined to Tartaros back into the Underworld. To contain the chaos, Hades instructs the Eagle Bearer to find new guardians for each of the Underworld's gates, promising to teach them about the Staff in return. The Eagle Bearer does so, and in the process is reunited with several of their deceased friends and adversaries, including Phoibe, Brasidas and Elpenor. After finding all the guardians, Hades betrays the Eagle Bearer and reveals his intention to turn them into a guardian as well, forcing the Eagle Bearer to fight him.

Following Hades' defeat, Poseidon arrives to take the Eagle Bearer to Atlantis, where he appoints them as Dikastes, his second-in-command. The Eagle Bearer is then tasked with exploring Atlantis to enforce Poseidon's laws and to ultimately pass judgement on the city. During their journey, the Eagle Bearer discovers that many Isu regularly disobey Poseidon's laws and commit crimes against humanity; the most egregious of which is "Project Olympos", a genetic engineering program led by Juno and Aita that combines abducted human subjects with Isu artifacts to create hybrid beasts. After defeating Juno and Aita's latest creation, the Hecatoncheires, the Eagle Bearer deems Atlantis beyond saving and, alongside Poseidon, activates a mechanism to sink the city. With the trails complete, the Eagle Bearer is congratulated by Aletheia for proving themselves worthy of wielding the Staff and embraces their new role as the Keeper.

In the present, Abstergo agents led by the Templar Juhani Otso Berg track down the Assassins, but Layla uses the Staff to fight them off. Seeing the negative influence the Staff is having on Layla, a concerned Victoria tries to take it away from her, only to be accidentally killed by Layla in a fit of rage. Having witnessed this, Aletheia is unsure if Layla is fit to wield the Staff, but the Assassin convinces her to let her prove herself. After defeating and crippling Otso Berg, an exhausted Layla contacts her team to be picked up.

=== Those Who Are Treasured ===
In 421 BC, the Eagle Bearer, exhausted by their adventures and pressured by their new responsibility as the Keeper, decides to take a vacation on the island of Korfu. After six months, Barnabas and Herodotos find them and are concerned that the Eagle Bearer has become sedentary, inviting them to take part in a treasure hunt. During their search, the Eagle Bearer stumbles upon a group of pirates who are looking for an artifact hidden on Korfu, and finds the key to the chest in which the artifact is held. After being forced to surrender the key to the pirates, who captured Herodotos, the Eagle Bearer confronts and kills the pirate captain, who has found the artifact: an Apple of Eden. As the Eagle Bearer approaches the Apple, it interacts with their spear, de-powering it.

Speaking with Aletheia, she informs the Eagle Bearer of other Isu artifacts hidden across the globe and claims that, as the Keeper, it is their duty to find and destroy them. However, the Eagle Bearer refuses to abandon their friends and life in Greece, leaving to find Barnabas, who the Apple has corrupted. After fighting Barnabas and separating him from the artifact, the Eagle Bearer decides to inform him of their immortality, which Barnabas agrees to keep secret. Now aware of the dangers of Isu artifacts, the Eagle Bearer accepts Aletheia's mission and leaves Greece to begin their new journey alongside Barnabas after gifting their spear to Herodotos. Centuries later, the Eagle Bearer, left to continue their journey alone, travels to Egypt and places a scroll given to them by Herodotos in the Library of Alexandria.

== Development ==
Assassin's Creed Odyssey was developed by Ubisoft Quebec. Development of the game commenced shortly following the release of Assassin's Creed Syndicate (2015). The game marked the transformation of Assassin's Creed from an action-adventure stealth game to an action role-playing game, a transition that began with Assassin's Creed Origins (2017), developed by long-time series developer Ubisoft Montreal. Origins marked the series' transition into a larger open world with a larger emphasis on player's progression, while Odyssey further facilitated this transition by introducing role-playing elements and choices. Origins was released a year earlier than Odyssey, and this allowed the Quebec team to incorporate changes to the game after listening to players' feedback. Similar to other Ubisoft games, numerous other developers from around the world participated in the game's development. The game was co-developed by Ubisoft's studios in Montreal, Bucharest, Montpellier, Singapore, Shanghai, Chengdu, Kyiv, and Pune. External studios including Spearsoft and Technicolor also provided additional assistance. The game was declared gold on September 14, 2018, meaning it was being prepared for duplication and release.

=== Narrative and art design ===
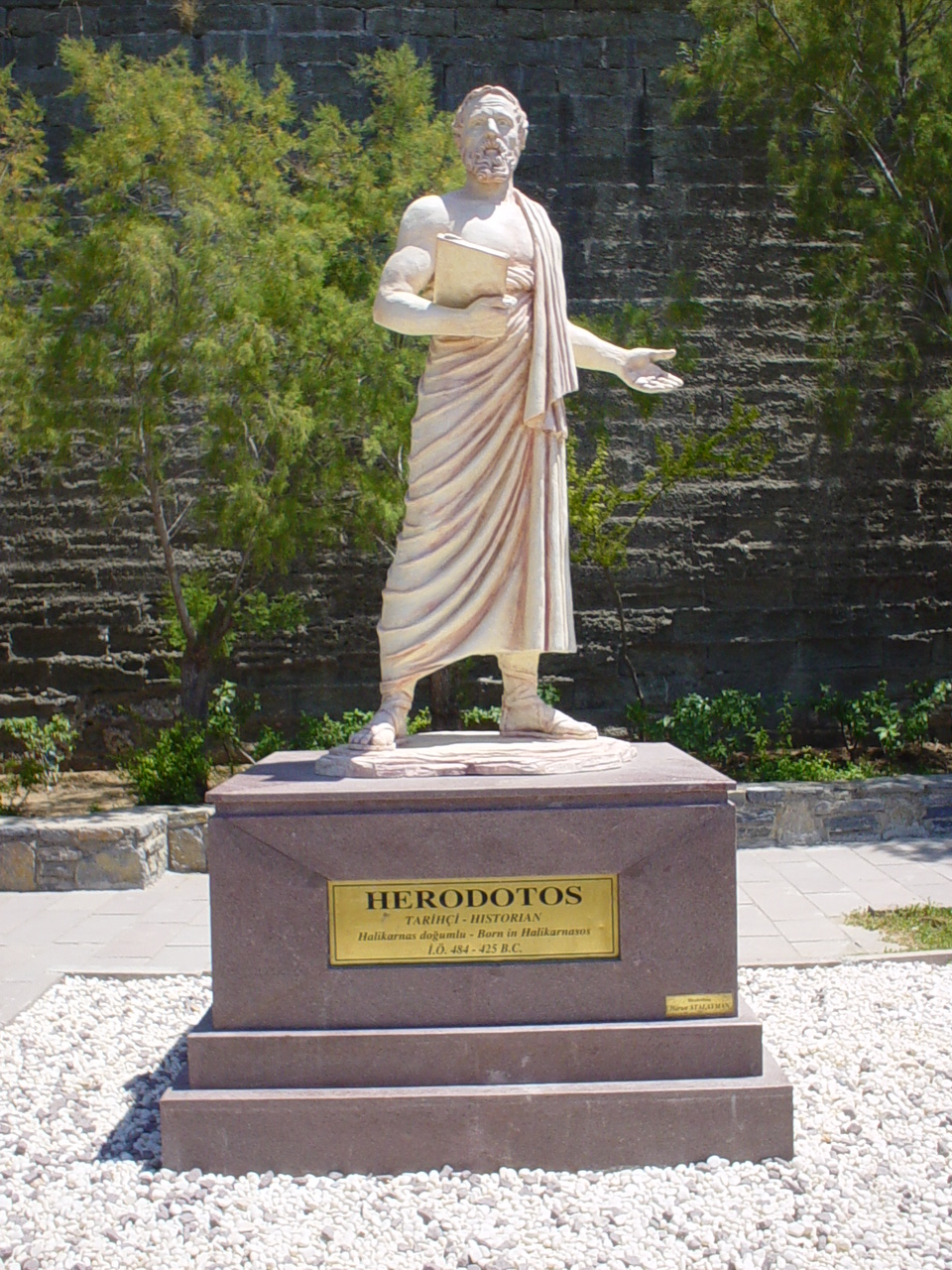
The works of ancient Greek historian Herodotus served as an important inspiration for the team. Herodotus is also featured in the game as a non-playable character.

Similar to other games in the series, Odyssey was inspired by history. Ancient Greece was one of the most requested regions by fans, and the era of the Peloponnesian War was chosen as the setting because it allowed the team to introduce well-known historical figures such as Socrates, Leonidas and Hippocrates. The works of Herodotus, considered the first historian in the Western world, served as an important inspiration and foundation for the team when they were creating the game's world and story. To ensure that the game feels historically authentic, the development team initially examined mainstream depictions of Ancient Greece, including films, paintings, and video games, and later embarked on a ten-day field trip to Greek locations including Sparta, Delphi, Olympia, and Athens. Three scouting groups accompanied by historians took more than 13,000 photos and videos during their field trip for research, and later the team made use of Google Street View to study Greek ruins. As a result, the game's art style intentionally deviated from popular depictions of ancient Greece, often filled with desaturated and monochromatic colors, with each game region instead having a rich and unique visual characteristic. The team was divided into a world design team, focused on making the world as historically accurate as possible, and a level design team, focused on what was most enjoyable for the players. Both teams were guided by Stéphanie-Anne Ruatta, an in-house historian for Ubisoft. In addition, the team consulted historians in the UK, Canada, and Greece.

Despite this, some parts of the game deviated from history. For instance, while real-life Spartans led minimalist lifestyles, the team added a lot of landmarks and decorations to Spartan cities in an effort to make them grander and more warrior-like in order to align with players' expectations. As some of the locations were already destroyed in real life, the designers created these buildings and landmarks themselves. Since the game was set farther in the past than most of the other games in the series, the team had much less material to rely on and had to introduce more original characters. As the game is set in ancient Greece, the team felt compelled to feature Greek mythology predominantly in the game. The monsters that Heracles encountered in his adventures were used as the foundations for the creatures featured in the game. Sphinx, the Cyclops, the Minotaur, and Medusa were chosen as bosses as the team believed that they were the most well-known monsters from the Greek mythology. According to Ruatta, Greece's status as the birthplace of democracy and philosophy was contrasted with landmarks based on Greek gods and mystical figures. This contrast helped reflect the conflict between "chaos" and "order," which is a central theme established throughout the Assassin's Creed series.

According to world director Mel MacCoubrey, the game is an "epic Greek tragedy" and features a personalized story about "a family that has been torn apart". MacCoubrey described the two potential player characters as "compassionate," "strong-willed," and "passionate". The story also discusses how the two characters, Alexios and Kassandra, find their place in the world and transcend to the status of Greek heroes. Alexios and Kassandra were portrayed by Michael Antonakos and Melissanthi Mahut respectively. Antonakos joined the cast before Mahut. The two met each other in Quebec City and discussed the two characters' perspectives of the Greek world and their family ties. During the audition process, the team were looking for Greek actors, or actors with Greek ancestry. Elias Toufexis was chosen to portray both Leonidas and Nikolaos. During his audition, he was asked to read out a script from The Godfather with a Greek accent instead of the game's actual script to ensure that the game would not be leaked early. In 2020, a report from Bloomberg alleged that plans for leading female characters in multiple Assassin's Creed games were scrapped or minimised due to a perception that games won't sell without a strong male lead. Odyssey's team originally pushed for Kassandra to be the sole lead character but was told that wasn't an option. The team also added romantic interests into the game. According to creative director Jonathan Dumont, the romance featured in the game was optional and the tone was kept relatively light-hearted. Characters can be romanced regardless of the gender of the player characters. While the team believed that these options made the players' journey more personalized, it is up to the player to decide if they want to pursue a relationship.

=== Gameplay design ===
To add player's agency, players need to make important choices during certain points of the game. The team created more than 30 hours of interactive cutscenes. The team was influenced by other open world RPGs such as The Witcher 3: Wild Hunt, The Elder Scrolls V: Skyrim and Fallout, all of which give players a lot of freedom. However, these choices would not affect the grand schemes of history and only shape the hero journey of Alexios or Kassandra. For instance, larger events such as the Plague of Athens will occur regardless of players' input. The role-playing journey was inspired by Homer's epic poem Odyssey, and the dialogue system introduced in the game was inspired by the dialogues of Plato. To give players more choices, the game is set 400 years before Origins, which depicts the establishment of the Assassin's creed. This means that the player character will not inadvertently become involved in the events of that game, thus granting them additional freedom when they are interacting with the world and the factions in the game. The team also designed the world to be responsive to the players' actions. For instance, unlike previous games in the series, the player would no longer "desynchronize" when they hurt innocent NPCs in the game. Instead, powerful mercenaries arrive to hunt the player as a consequence of their actions. This system is similar to the "nemesis system" introduced in Middle-earth: Shadow of Mordor (2014), as each mercenary has their own routine, strengths and weaknesses. The team believed that this system allowed the game to remain persistently challenging. The game will not inform the players when they have made an important choice, and the consequences of a certain action may not be immediately shown. Initially, the team incorporated a system that tracked how many players selected which option and let the player compare their choices to the rest of the player base, but this feature was ultimately scrapped.

The development team made multiple changes to the gameplay systems. After listening to player feedback regarding Origins, the team decided to include difficulty scaling in Odyssey. Consumables can no longer be bought in Odyssey, but they can be activated during combat to provide players with a small boost. While the hit-box system from Origins returns in Odyssey, the game features a faster combat system. Players are required to be more agile, and actions such as parrying, dodging and rolling are encouraged. As the player character is equipped with the blade of Leonidas, a First Civilization artifact, the team wanted players to feel overpowered and adopt a more offensive playstyle. To further facilitate this, players can no longer carry a shield to block attack like they did in Origins. The accumulation of adrenaline in Odyssey is also significantly faster than that of Origins. Like other aspects of the game, the team wanted to give players more freedom and choices. As a result, players can experiment with different customization options, and freely choose how they want to approach their objectives. The team also introduced procedurally generated quests for the players and recorded 20,000 dialogue lines for this system. The team had to substantially redesign the naval combat systems featured in Origins for Odyssey, as the transition from land-based combat to naval combat needed to be seamless.

=== Music ===
The musical duo of Joe Henson and Alexis Smith, collectively known as The Flight, served as the game's composers. The two previously composed the music for the multiplayer portion of Assassin's Creed IV: Black Flag (2013). Since Odyssey is a massive role-playing game, the team described the music composition process as an intimidating challenge, especially since they were not given a lot of time to complete the production of the game's soundtracks. The team listened to Greek and Mediterranean folk music for inspirations, but did not listen to the scores of other games in the series. One exception was "Ezio’s Family," which was present in nearly all games in the series. The team purchased and used dulcimers, lyres, panpipes, and a bouzouki during the recording process to give the music "a strong geographical stamp". Each region featured in the game has its own musical styles. For example, the Athenian homeland utilizes homophonic melodies to elicit a stately, dignified atmosphere which is fitting for the birthplace of democracy. The main theme, "Legend of the Eagle Bearer" was composed in an hour, but battle themes such as the track "On The Battlefield" were more challenging for the team and took more time.

== Release ==
The game was leaked in May 2018 after the French site JeuxVideoLive received a keychain containing the name Assassin's Creed Odyssey on it. The game was officially announced at E3 2018. Google partnered with Ubisoft for the promotion of streaming service Stadia (then codenamed "Project Stream"). Players who playtested Odyssey on Stadia for an hour would receive a PC copy of the game for free. The game was released for PlayStation 4, Windows, and Xbox One on October 5, 2018. A Nintendo Switch version was announced during the Japanese September 2018 Nintendo Direct. This version of the game is a cloud-based title which launched on the same day as the other platforms, but in Japan only. The game features reversible cover art which allows the player to display either of the two playable characters. Several special editions of Odyssey including bonus in-game content and additional items have been released.

A novelization of the game, which features Kassandra as the sole protagonist, was written by Gordon Doherty and released on October 5, 2018. In May 2019, Ubisoft launched "Beyond Medusa’s Gate," a location-based virtual reality experience in 100 locations in Europe and North America. The positive critical reception to Odyssey prompted Ubisoft to greenlight Immortals Fenyx Rising, which features various gods and monsters from Greek mythology.

=== Additional content ===
Despite the game's single-player nature, Ubisoft adopted a "game as a service" model for Odyssey and released a significant amount of content for the game after its release. The team was split into three: one team worked on quality-of-life changes, another worked on free content, and the last team developed the two paid story expansions. The release schedule of additional content was inspired by other Ubisoft games such as For Honor, Tom Clancy's Rainbow Six Siege and Tom Clancy's The Division.

The game's season pass includes two downloadable content (DLC) stories as well as remastered editions of Assassin's Creed III and Assassin's Creed Liberation. The two paid expansions are Legacy of the First Blade (consisting of three episodes released periodically from December 2018 to March 2019) and The Fate of Atlantis (also consisting of three episodes released from April to July 2019). Legacy of the First Blade explores the Eagle Bearer and Darius' conflict with the Order of the Ancients and the history of the titular first Hidden Blade, thus connecting Odyssey to the wider Assassin's Creed franchise. The Fate of Atlantis focuses on Greek mythology and introduces three new explorable regions: Elysium, Hades, and Atlantis. Each region grants the Eagle Bearer access to new abilities and presents a series of trials meant to help the Eagle Bearer better understand their duties as Keeper of the Staff of Hermes.

In addition to the paid content, Ubisoft periodically released new story-focused missions known as the "Lost Tales of Greece" for free. A Transmogrification feature known as "Visual Customization" was introduced on November 14, 2018, and a New Game Plus mode was released on February 26, 2019. Additional costumes and ship lieutenants, including some based on previous protagonists of the series like Ezio Auditore, Evie Frye, and Bayek, were also released for free. Quality-of-life changes, such as the option to adjust difficulty scaling and the introduction of mastery levels, were also introduced. A story creator mode allowing players to create and share custom-made quests was released in June 2019. Discovery Tour: Ancient Greece, an educational mode that lets the player choose between roaming the world of Ancient Greece to learn more about its history and daily life or embarking on guided tours curated by historians, was released in September 2019, serving as the second installment of the Discovery Tour sub-series.

The game also includes support for UHD resolution on the PS4 Pro and Xbox One X. In August 2021, Ubisoft released a patch for Odyssey, which boosted the framerate to 60fps on PlayStation 5 and Xbox Series X/S.

=== Critical reception ===
Reception

Aggregate score
Aggregator	Score
Metacritic	(XONE) 87/100 (PC) 86/100 (PS4) 83/100

Review scores
Publication	Score
Eurogamer	Recommended
Game Informer	8.25/10
GameSpot	8/10
GamesRadar+	5/5
Giant Bomb	3/5
IGN	9.2/10
PC Gamer (US)	90/100

Assassin's Creed Odyssey received "generally favorable" reviews from critics according to review aggregator website Metacritic. Most critics agreed that Odyssey is a successful transformation for the series from stealth games to action role-playing games.

The open world was generally praised; writing for GamesRadar, Sam Loveridge applauded the design of Greece and enjoyed the sense of exploration. Loveridge described the sidequests in Odyssey as a significant improvement when compared with previous installments in the series. In particular, he enjoyed how lengthy and polished some of the side quests are, adding that they became indistinguishable from the main quests. Alessandro Fillari from GameSpot applauded the team's attention to detail, and was impressed by how reactive the world is. He enjoyed the enormous scale of the world, but remarked that some features, such as Conquest battle, were underdeveloped and clashed with the themes of the main story. Tom Phillips from Eurogamer was also impressed by the scale of the world, and compared it favourably to The Witcher 3: Wild Hunt. Stephanie Clark, also from Eurogamer, added that "the sense of the true epic pervades the game" and believed that the campaign lived up to its Homeric inspiration. IGN's Brandin Tyrrel described the in-game version of Greece as "a stunning series of picturesque locales," but remarked that occasional graphical hiccups may hinder the experience. While some reviewers enjoyed the scope of its world and the cohesiveness of its gameplay system, Alex Navarro from Giant Bomb believed that the game was too repetitive and bloated with content. Andrew Webster, writing for The Verge further remarked that the abundance of systems diluted the experience, and exclaimed that Odyssey lost its identity as an Assassin's Creed game and became indistinguishable from other similar open world games.

The gameplay received generally positive opinions. Loveridge believed that Odyssey had refined and streamlined elements from Origins, making it a "more enjoyable experience". Fillari liked the special abilities in the game and believed that they encouraged experimentation. He further noted that the combat had a faster pace and that it was more "involved" and "dynamic". Tyrrel liked the variety of the weapons and wrote that each weapon type was unique and distinctive. He further applauded the skill trees for accommodating the playstyles of different players. Joe Juba, writing for Game Informer, called the combat system in Odyssey his favourite in the series, praising the special abilities for conveying "a dynamic and godlike sense of power". Juba liked the mercenary systems for creating a lot of intense combat situations, but he remarked that their continuous presence may also annoy the players, especially when they intervene during mainline quests. While Juba noted that the world was reactive, he was disappointed by the lack of deliberately crafted moments and felt that the overall experience was overly predictable. Steven Messner from PC Gamer felt that the game refined and expanded the systems present in Origins, though he remarked that the levelling system means that players are forced to grind for experience points in order to progress, and commented that the artificial intelligence featured in the game was inconsistent.

Critics praised the story, though some criticized its pacing and for feeling overambitious. Tyrrel described the story as a "straightforward family drama," and appreciated that the conflicts between the Assassins and the Templars played a minimal role in Odyssey. Loveridge described the story as an "engrossing" experience, and noted that the choices actually had consequences. Phillips enjoyed the story twists featured in the game and remarked that the story had "a few genuinely tragic moments". Although Messner felt that the story was disjointed and over-ambitious, he noted that the addition of choices added player agency and made the experience worthwhile. Fillari added that because players' choices can lead to different outcomes, the narrative can feel very personalized. The humour featured in the game was praised for alleviating the tension despite the seriousness of the main story. Kassandra was generally singled out as one of the best protagonists in the series. The pacing of the story was a common criticism, as players often have to complete side quests in order to advance the main story. This concern was further aggravated by the scale and the density of the world. Ubisoft attracted criticisms for selling experience boosts, which speed up the game's progression, via microtransactions.

=== Sales ===
In its week of release, physical sales were down 25% when compared to Origins. In the US the first week of sales were pacing better than any other title of the series on the current generation of consoles. Ubisoft said that digital sales of the game were 45% of all sales, which was up by 10 percentage points over the previous year's Assassin's Creed Origins. According to Ubisoft, Assassin's Creed Odyssey achieved the best launch-week sales in the franchise's history for the eighth console generation, surpassing Assassin's Creed Origins, which had doubled Assassin's Creed Syndicate's sales over their respective first 10 days. It was the third best-selling video game in the US in October 2018, only behind Call of Duty: Black Ops 4 and Red Dead Redemption II. More than 10 million units of the game had been sold by March 2020. Revenue earned from microtransactions was 170% higher in Odyssey when compared to that of Origins.

In July 2026, following the release of Christopher Nolan's The Odyssey, Assassin's Creed Odyssey experienced a significant increase in player engagement. According to IGN, the game's active userbase nearly doubled across PlayStation, Xbox, and Steam within a week of the film's release, with Ubisoft's marketing efforts and the game's availability through subscription services contributing to renewed interest. The momentum continued the following month, with the game reaching 89% positive reviews on Steam and overtaking Assassin's Creed II at 86%.

=== Awards ===
Year	Award	Category	Result	Ref.
2018	Game Critics Awards	Best Console Game	Nominated	
2018	Game Critics Awards	Best Action/Adventure Game	Nominated	
2018	Gamescom 2018	Best Role-Playing Game	Nominated	
2018	Gamescom 2018	Best Console Game (PlayStation 4)	Nominated	
2018	Golden Joystick Awards	Ultimate Game of the Year	Nominated	
2018	The Game Awards 2018	Game of the Year	Nominated	
2018	The Game Awards 2018	Best Art Direction	Nominated	
2018	The Game Awards 2018	Best Performance (Melissanthi Mahut)	Nominated	
2018	The Game Awards 2018	Best Action/Adventure Game	Nominated	
2018	Gamers' Choice Awards	Fan Favorite Game	Nominated	
2018	Gamers' Choice Awards	Fan Favorite Action Game	Nominated	
2018	Gamers' Choice Awards	Fan Favorite Single Player Gaming Experience	Nominated	
2018	Gamers' Choice Awards	Fan Favorite Character of the Year (Alexios and Kassandra)	Nominated	
2018	Gamers' Choice Awards	Fan Favorite Male Voice Actor (Michael Antonakos)	Nominated	
2018	Gamers' Choice Awards	Fan Favorite Female Voice Actor (Melissanthi Mahut)	Nominated	
2018	Titanium Awards	Game of the Year	Nominated	
2018	Titanium Awards	Best Artistic Design	Won	
2018	Titanium Awards	Best Narrative Design	Nominated	
2018	Titanium Awards	Best Game Design	Nominated	
2018	Titanium Awards	Best Performance in Spanish (Joël Mulachs)	Nominated	
2018	Titanium Awards	Best Adventure Game	Nominated	
2018	Australian Games Awards	RPG of the Year	Nominated	
2018	Australian Games Awards	Action/Adventure Title of the Year	Nominated	
2018	Australian Games Awards	Game of the Year	Nominated	
2018	The Steam Awards	The "Best Alternate History" Award	Won	
2019	New York Game Awards	Statue of Liberty Award for Best World	Nominated	
2019	22nd Annual D.I.C.E. Awards	Role-Playing Game of the Year	Nominated	
2019	22nd Annual D.I.C.E. Awards	Outstanding Achievement in Character (Kassandra)	Nominated	
2019	22nd Annual D.I.C.E. Awards	Outstanding Achievement in Story	Nominated	
2019	Writers Guild of America Awards 2018	Outstanding Achievement in Videogame Writing	Nominated	
2019	National Academy of Video Game Trade Reviewers Awards	Animation, Artistic	Nominated	
2019	National Academy of Video Game Trade Reviewers Awards	Animation, Technical	Nominated	
2019	National Academy of Video Game Trade Reviewers Awards	Art Direction, Period Influence	Nominated	
2019	National Academy of Video Game Trade Reviewers Awards	Costume Design	Nominated	
2019	National Academy of Video Game Trade Reviewers Awards	Design, Franchise	Nominated	
2019	National Academy of Video Game Trade Reviewers Awards	Original Dramatic Score, Franchise	Nominated	
2019	National Academy of Video Game Trade Reviewers Awards	Use of Sound, Franchise	Nominated	
2019	SXSW Gaming Awards	Excellence in Visual Achievement	Nominated	
2019	Game Developers Choice Awards	Best Technology	Nominated	
2019	2019 G.A.N.G. Awards	Audio of the Year	Nominated	
2019	2019 G.A.N.G. Awards	Best Cinematic Cutscene Audio	Nominated	
2019	2019 G.A.N.G. Awards	Best Dialogue	Nominated	
2019	30th GLAAD Media Awards	Outstanding Video Game	Nominated	
2019	15th British Academy Games Awards	Best Game	Nominated	
2019	15th British Academy Games Awards	Performer (Melissanthi Mahut)	Nominated	
2019	Italian Video Game Awards	People's Choice	Nominated	
2019	Italian Video Game Awards	Game of the Year	Nominated	
2019	Italian Video Game Awards	Best Art Direction	Nominated	
2019	Italian Video Game Awards	Best Character (Kassandra)	Nominated	
2019	Ivor Novello Awards	Best Original Video Game Score	Nominated	

== Sequel ==
A sequel, titled Assassin's Creed Valhalla, set during the Viking expansion across Europe, was released in November 2020 for PlayStation 4, PlayStation 5, Windows, Xbox One and Xbox Series X and Series S. A major update for Odyssey and Valhalla was released on December 14, 2021, which offers free downloadable content for both games. The first part of the content, titled "Those Who Are Treasured", is available in Odyssey and serves as a conclusive epilogue to the Eagle Bearer's journey in the period of Classical Greece. The second part, titled "A Fated Encounter," is a crossover mission in Valhalla which explores the ties between the game's protagonist, Eivor Varinsdottir, and Kassandra as the canonical Eagle Bearer following the events of "Those Who Are Treasured".
