= Alexios and Kassandra =

Assassin's Creed characters

- Assassin's Creed character
- First appearance: Assassin's Creed Odyssey (2018)
- Created by: Ubisoft Quebec
- Adapted by: Gordon Doherty
- Portrayed by: Michael Antonakos (Alexios); Melissanthi Mahut (Kassandra)
- Voiced by: Leonidas Castrounis (Alexios, young); Maria Syrgiannis (Kassandra, young)

In-universe information
- Family: Myrrine (mother); Pythagoras (Kassandra's father); Nikolaos (Alexios's father; Kassandra's stepfather); Damo (Kassandra's half-sister); Myia (Kassandra's half-sister)
- Significant other: Natakas (Kassandra's lover)
- Children: Elpidios (Kassandra's son)
- Relatives: Leonidas I (grandfather); Aya (Kassandra's descendant); Khemu (Kassandra's descendant)
- Origin: Sparta, Ancient Greece
- Nationality: Greek

Alexios (Greek: Αλέξιος) and Kassandra (Greek: Κασσάνδρα) are two interconnected fictional characters in Ubisoft's Assassin's Creed video game franchise, first appearing as the player characters of the 2018 video game Assassin's Creed Odyssey. Alexios and Kassandra are portrayed through performance capture by Michael Antonakos and Melissanthi Mahut respectively. Leonidas Castrounis and Maria Syrgiannis respectively voice the two characters as children in flashbacks.

Within the series' alternate historical setting, the characters are half-siblings who were separated from their Spartan parents and each other during childhood due to a prophecy delivered by the Pythia, the Oracle of Delphi. Through their mother Myrrine, the siblings are descendants of a fictional version of Leonidas I, who is himself descended from the otherworldly Isu, the so-called First Civilization, and wielded a spear that is imbued with fantastical powers. In Odyssey, the player has the choice to experience the memories of either Alexios or Kassandra as part of a simulation played by another in-game character, Layla Hassan. The chosen character becomes the elder sibling in the game's narrative, who is stranded from childhood on the island of Kephalonia following a traumatic incident at Mount Taygetos, and as an adult becomes a legendary mercenary known as the "Eagle Bearer". The younger sibling in turn becomes "Deimos", a revered enforcer of a secret society known as the Cult of Kosmos and one of the game's primary antagonists.

Odyssey's story follows the Eagle Bearer's journey across Classical Greece during the Peloponnesian War as they attempt to reunite their fractured family and hunt down the Cult of Kosmos, who are depicted as the orchestrators of the war. Within the series' lore, Kassandra is designated as the canon Eagle Bearer, appearing as such in Odyssey's novelization and later reconfirmed in Odyssey's successor, Assassin's Creed Valhalla, in which Kassandra appears as a guest character as part of a bonus questline added after the game's release.

Both characters have received a positive reception from video game journalists and series fans following their debut. Kassandra in particular has received attention as a positive example of gender equality and representation in video games, as well as critical acclaim in response to Mahut's performance and interpretation of the character.

== Character overview ==
In Odyssey, former Abstergo employee Layla Hassan discovers the broken spear of King Leonidas of Sparta, which is in fact a powerful Isu artifact. After reliving Leonidas' final moment of triumph during the Battle of Thermopylai for the game's tutorial section, she is then presented with a choice to explore the genetic memories of Leonidas' grandchildren, either Alexios or Kassandra, via her portable Animus machine in her search for the Staff of Hermes Trismegistus, another Isu artifact. Whoever is chosen by the player as Layla in Odyssey is revealed to be the legendary mercenary known as the Eagle Bearer who was active during the Peloponnesian War, and whose exploits are detailed in the purportedly lost accounts of a version of Herodotos in the Assassin's Creed universe. As a mercenary who is typically referred to by the term misthios which means "employed for hire" or "hired servant" in the ancient Greek language, the Eagle Bearer is a departure from series tradition as they have no direct ties to the Assassin Brotherhood or any related organization.

As Alexios or Kassandra, the player may choose how to respond to non-player characters by engaging in dialogue trees with them to learn information and progress the story, with some of the choices potentially changing or affecting the fates of the characters they interact with. Throughout the game the Eagle Bearer has access to a loyal horse named Phobos, whose appearance is customizable and can be summoned almost anytime and anywhere. The Eagle Bearer embarks on an extended journey across the Greek world on board their ship the Adrestia, where they encounter interpretations of various real world historical figures in the Assassin's Creed universe such as Perikles, Kleon, Aspasia, Sokrates, Alkibiades, Aristophanes, Hippokrates, Brasidas, and the Two Kings of Sparta.

For the game's novelization written by Gordon Doherty, Kassandra appears as the Eagle Bearer who opposes the Cult of Kosmos and eventually inherits the Staff of Hermes Trismegistus from Pythagoras. Alexios is shaped to become a weapon to be used by the Cult, henceforth known by the name Deimos. His allegiance to the Cult puts him at odds with his sister, who attempts to dismantle their influence across the Greek world in the midst of the Peloponnesian War and to reunite their family, and later dies fighting Kassandra at Mount Taygethos.

== Creation and development ==
In an interview by Tom Hoggins from The Telegraph, Odyssey senior producer Marc-Alexis Côté said that the Kephallonia section early in the game is "about discovering who these characters are and find out why you should join them on this journey". Côté explained that the notion of choice is determined by the development team as one of their "core pillars" for the game, and that is extended to the player being given their choice of character. Côté noted that player feedback from the option to play as Evie Frye in Assassin's Creed Syndicate helped informed the team with insight on how to push this further for Odyssey, and claimed that the team was able to build a better game as a result as everyone is satisfied with the "good gender split on the game". The implementation of a branching dialogue system, which Côté said is supposed to transform the way player's would approach their gameplay experience through dialogue choices, was the main change in how the developmental team approached building the game. He explained that it involved a lot more preparation compared to previous projects in the series, as the writing team for Odyssey expanded from a duo to a team of fifteen staff members during development. Côté said that the game's novelization was an extension of the project, and as its narrative is meant to be linear, a canon storyline for the novel had to be drafted.

In July 2020, a report by Jason Schreier from Bloomberg about the mishandling of sexual misconduct allegations by Ubisoft claimed that Kassandra was originally meant to be the sole playable character of Odyssey, and the inclusion of Alexios as an alternative player character was insinuated to be the result of a compromise with Ubisoft management, a situation described to be "illustrative of the sexism ingrained within the company".

=== Portrayal ===
Actors Michael Antonakos and Melissanthi Mahut, who portray Alexios and Kassandra respectively, are of Greek heritage. With regards to the casting process of characters in Odyssey, audio director Lydia Andrew noted that Ubisoft tried to look for actors who are from Greece or have Greek ancestry. She indicated that it felt like a good opportunity to have a "deep dive into the culture of Greece and obviously Ancient Greece", and that it is just as important to work with good Greek actors as casting a great actor who is very good at portraying an accent. Mahut recalled that Antonakos was already chosen for the role of Alexios prior to the finalization of her own audition for the role of Kassandra, where she had the opportunity to play off Antonakos.

At the beginning of the process, the creative directors and writers of Odyssey gave both actors a "skeleton" idea of their characters as well as some insight as to their history, possible path and general characteristics. Antonakos and Mahut made it a point to work as a team, often holding discussions with each other about where they saw their respective characters going, and what they thought their main attributes were, and how they would respond in key situations. During motion capture sessions they would constantly give each other notes as to how they would like to approach certain scenes. Voice over sessions involved a lengthier process as they often were not in the same area or room, so they followed their personal choices as well as guidance by their respective directors.

Antonakos did not initially know what Alexios would look like and developed his own take on the character by drawing inspiration from previous series protagonist Ezio Auditore da Firenze, as well as the animated series iterations of Wolverine and Batman from the 1980s and 1990s. Antonakos described Alexios as a "boisterous Bruce Wayne with a Greek accent" who resembles an "explosive Wolverine" when he is angry. Antonakos was also inspired by Pink Floyd's Wish You Were Here, which he used to ground the character into something deeper after he is given the context of the character's backstory as a "soundtrack to his pain". On the character's display of machismo, Antonakos said Alexios is essentially a demigod with supernatural strength who is also immersed in the Ancient Greek warrior culture and explained that his arrogance is "just a show, a mask for his insecurity of being alone", noting that he is in truth "a big kid acting tough" with "huge guilt issues" and "something to prove".

On portraying the identity of Deimos for their respective characters, Mahut wanted Kassandra to remain as a relatable character, even when she commits acts which are cruel or inhumane. She took key elements that made the elder sibling what they are, and "put a filter over them". She tried to imagine how a younger sibling would evolve from a traumatic childhood of being rejected and abandoned, but at the same time possessing a god-like strength. Antonakos decided to play Deimos as a different person entirely, and explained that he is the younger sibling who never experienced a normal childhood living in Spartan society and thus does not possess the same moral compass an elder Alexios would have had because he was never shown any compassion and sympathy by those who raised him. Antonakos projected a darker and lower voice compared to the one he gave Alexios as the Eagle Bearer, giving him no room for a smile unless it had a sense of tormenting behind it. As part of their motion capture performances, which constituted about 10%-15% of the game, the actors had to wear velcro/lycra suits and helmets with attached cameras. Both Antonakos and Mahut did their best to match each other's performances, gestures and movements, as the production team would use the same edits to cut the scenes together.

== Appearances ==
=== Assassin's Creed Odyssey ===
Kassandra is the protagonist of Assassin's Creed Odyssey, in which her life and exploits in Classical Greece are explored by Layla Hassan, who uses her Animus device to relive Kassandra's genetic memories via a DNA sample recovered from the broken Spear of Leonidas. Within series lore, Kassandra was born in Sparta in 458 BC and was initially raised by her mother Myrrine and stepfather Nikolaos. When Kassandra is seven, her infant brother Alexios is sentenced to death in deference to an oracle's prophecy which said he could potentially doom Sparta. While trying stop a Spartan elder from dropping Alexios off Mount Taygetos, Kassandra accidentally pushes the elder to his death and is branded a traitor by the Spartan leadership, who compel Nikolaos to cast her down as well. Surviving the fall, Kassandra escapes from Sparta and makes her way to the island of Kephallonia, where she is taken in by a con man named Markos. Under Markos' care, Kassandra would grow up to become a skilled mercenary, renowned as "the Eagle Bearer."

In 431 BC, at the onset of the Peloponnesian War, Kassandra uncovers the existence of a secret society called the Cult of Kosmos when she is hired by one of its members to assassinate a Spartan general known as "The Wolf of Sparta." After befriending a naval captain named Barnabas and assuming command of his ship, the Adrestia, Kassandra travels to Megaris to fulfill his contract, only to discover that "The Wolf" is Nikolaos and that the Cult is targeting her family. Upon infiltrating a Cult meeting in disguise, Kassandra learns that the Cult orchestrated the war to take control of Greece, and had kidnapped Alexios following his fall from Mount Taygetos, brainwashing him to serve their cause and be their champion known as "Deimos."

Vowing revenge on the Cult for breaking her family apart, Kassandra embarks on an extensive journey throughout Greece to eliminate its members and reunite her family, during which she allies with various historical figures like Herodotos, Sokrates, Brasidas, and Aspasia. She is eventually able to find Myrrine, who became the oligarch of the polis of Naxos after leaving Sparta, and reconcile with Nikolaos and his adoptive son Stentor. Myrrine then convinces her daughter to help reinstate their Spartan citizenship and ancestral estate, and encourages her to rescue Alexios from the Cult's influence. Afterwards, Kassandra returns with Myrinne to Mount Taygetos to confront Deimos. Depending on key decisions made by the player at predetermined points of the game's narrative, Kassandra either redeems or kills Deimos with the actions have a direct bearing on the fates of the extended family members and determines whether there will be a successful family reunion for the main plotline's epilogue.

After successfully vanquishing the Cult, Kassandra heads to their meeting place under the Temple of Delphi, where she destroys their pyramid-shaped artifact and is met by Aspasia, who reveals herself to be the Cult's original leader and that she secretly helped Kassandra dismantle it after it had become corrupt under Deimos' influence. During her journey, Kassandra also collects various Isu artifacts at the request of her biological father Pythagoras, the assigned Keeper of the Staff of Hermes Trismegistus and guardian of the secrets of Atlantis. After using the collected artifacts to seal Atlantis, Pythagoras relinquishes the Staff to Kassandra, who becomes its new Keeper and is granted biological immortality.

In 2018, Kassandra, kept alive by the Staff of Hermes for thousands of years, meets Layla in Atlantis after the latter discovered its location from Kassandra's memories. After warning Layla about the dangers of Isu technology, Kassandra bestows the Staff to her, as she was instructed to do by the Isu Aletheia—whose consciousness is stored inside the Staff—and passes away.

==== Legacy of the First Blade ====
The first story expansion for the game, Legacy of the First Blade, set during the events of the main narrative campaign, follows Kassandra as she joins forces with Darius, a Persian renegade and freedom fighter, to fight the growing influence of the Order of the Ancients, the precursors to the Templar Order, who are the series' perennial antagonists. The Order is committing atrocities throughout Greece to draw out Darius and the "Tainted Ones", people descended from the Isu, such as Kassandra and her family, which the Order seeks to eliminate, believing they have the potential to doom humanity. Over the course of the expansion, Kassandra starts a family with Natakas, Darius' son, giving birth to a boy they name Elpidios, who is later taken by the Order after they murder Natakas. Kassandra and Darius exact revenge on the Order and kill its leader, Darius' former friend Amorges, who gives them Elpidios' whereabouts but warns them that the Order can not be vanquished and that Elpidios will never be safe as long as he is with Kassandra. After finding Elpidios, Kassandra, concerned for his safety, decides to leave him with Darius, trusting him to look after his grandson. Darius takes Elpidios to Egypt, when it is revealed that he would become an ancestor to Aya, a major character from Assassin's Creed Origins and one of the co-founders of the Hidden Ones, a precursor organization to the Assassin Brotherhood.

==== The Fate of Atlantis ====
The second story expansion, The Fate of Atlantis, is set after the events of the base game and follows Kassandra's quest to learn how to unlock the full power of the Staff of Hermes after it was passed down to her. As part of her training under Aletheia, Kassandra is transported to a simulation based on the Isu realm of Elysium, where she becomes involved with Adonis' human rebellion against Persephone's rule. Once Persephone is defeated, she banishes Kassandra to the Underworld along with her dog Ros, who is transformed into Cerberos. Kassandra slays Cerberos, but this opens numerous rifts between Tartaros and the Underworld, releasing souls confined to Tartaros back into the Underworld. To contain the chaos, Hades tasks Kassandra with finding new guardians for each of the gateways to the Underworld, only to betray her afterwards. Kassandra defeats Hades before Poseidon appears and escorts her to Atlantis, where he appoints her as Dikastes, his second-in-command, who is responsible with enforcing Poseidon's laws and maintaining order, as well passing judgment on Atlantis.

While exploring Atlantis, Kassandra discovers that the Isu regularly disobey Poseidon's laws and commit crimes against humanity; the most egregious of which is "Project Olympos," a genetic engineering program led by Juno and her husband Aita, which combines abducted human subjects with Isu artifacts to create hybrid beasts. Deeming Atlantis beyond saving, Kassandra and Poseidon sink the city using the fully activated Staff of Hermes, causing the former to awaken back in the mortal world. There, she is informed by Aletheia that all the events she experienced were Aletheia's memories during her time as Dikastes, and that she has proven herself to be worthy of wielding the Staff.

==== Those Who Are Treasured ====
Those Who Are Treasured is a free story expansion that serves as an epilogue to the main narrative of Odyssey, depicting Kassandra's final adventure in Greece. After taking a six month vacation on the island of Korfu, a reluctant Kassandra is recruited by Barnabas and Herodotos for a treasure hunt they organised, which turns into a hunt for an Isu artifact—an Apple of Eden—after Kassandra accidentally stumbles upon a group of pirates who are also looking for the relic. Kassandra is eventually able to recover the Apple, but it depowers the Spear of Leonidas and corrupts Barnabas, forcing Kassandra to fight her friend over the artifact. After saving Barnabas and destroying the Apple, Kassandra is informed by Aletheia that part of her duty as Keeper of the Staff of Hermes is to find and destroy similarly dangerous Isu artifacts around the world. Kassandra bids farewell to Herodotos, to whom she gifts her depowered spear as a memento, and departs Greece with Barnabas to begin her new journey.

=== Assassin's Creed Valhalla ===
Kassandra returns in Assassin's Creed Valhalla as part of the free Assassin's Creed Crossover Stories DLC expansion. She is featured in the questline titled "A Fated Encounter", where she comes face-to-face with Eivor Varinsdottir, the main protagonist of Valhalla, whilst hunting for an Isu artifact that is causing nightmares amongst the locals on the Isle of Skye, during the late 9th century. The DLC establishes that, ever since the deaths of all of her companions, Kassandra has become very solitary and anti-social, refusing to stay in a single place for too long or form connections with people due to her knowledge that she would eventually outlive them. Because of this, she is reluctant to work with Eivor to find and destroy the Isu artifact after Aletheia instructs her to do so. However, after accomplishing her mission and later attending a wedding alongside Eivor, Kassandra learns to open up to people more and is able to part ways with Eivor on good terms.

=== Other appearances ===
Both Alexios and Kassandra appear as playable characters in Assassin's Creed: Rebellion, a mobile free-to-play strategy RPG action game. Kassandra's default outfit from Odyssey (referred to in-game as Alexios' outfit) is an unlockable cosmetic option in the remastered version of Assassin's Creed III, released in 2019. Kassandra is also featured as one of the three playable characters of the 2023 virtual reality game, Assassin's Creed Nexus VR. Her story arc is set in 404 BC, nearly two decades after the conclusion of Odyssey, and follows Kassandra as she returns to Greece to deal with the Spartan oligarchy installed in Athens known as the Thirty Tyrants

As part of Reverse: 1999 collabaration event with Asasssin's Creed: Odyssey, both Alexios and Kassandra appeared as playable characters. Kassandra appears in Watcher of Realms as one of the unlockable characters introduced during its collaboration event with the Assassin’s Creed franchise.

== Promotion and merchandise ==
Although Kassandra is designated as the canon Eagle Bearer for the novelization and was featured prominently in gameplay demo footage shown at E3 2018, the vast majority of the marketing campaign and available merchandise for Odyssey exclusively featured Alexios, including the game's three pre-order statues, cover art, official trailer, header image on Uplay, and so on.

As part of a promotional collaboration between Ubisoft and Amazon, Antonakos' voice as Alexios is featured as part of "Assassin’s Creed Odyssey Spartan Skill", a free downloadable Alexa-based content available for all Amazon Echo devices. A limited edition Assassin’s Creed-themed Amazon Echo device, designed to resemble a Spartan helmet, was also released.

== Reception ==
Prior to the release of Odyssey on October 5, 2018, Côté observed that there appeared to be a lot of interest into being able to play a female lead character, with about three quarters of players selecting Kassandra as the player character during a gameplay preview session in September 2018, which exceeded his own expectations. Ubisoft Québec Game Director Scott Phillips revealed that two-thirds of Odyssey players chose to play Alexios by December 2018, although he noted that the choices were statistically more evenly split during the game's playtesting stage. Both Alexios and Kassandra were jointly nominated for the 2018 Gamers' Choice Awards' Fan Favorite Character of the Year, while their respective actors received nominations in the Fan Favorite Voice Actor awards. For the 30th GLAAD Media Awards in 2019, Odyssey was one of five nominees for the inaugural "Outstanding Video Game" category. GLAAD credited the positive depiction of Kassandra and Alexios as sexually fluid characters to be one of the rationales behind the nomination, though the controversy generated by the Legacy of the First Blade DLC pack was also acknowledged. Xalavier Nelson Jr. from Rock, Paper, Shotgun was of the view that both are "distinct, compelling, and valid protagonists" in their own right, and that the subtle variations between both choices colours the events of their game moreso than the differences between a male and female Commander Shepard for the original Mass Effect trilogy. On the other hand, both Ali Jones from PCGamesN and Fraser Brown from Rock, Paper, Shotgun questioned the Alexios-centric marketing campaign for Odyssey and the lack of promotion for his female counterpart. Joe Parlock opined that the executive-mandated decision to have an interchangeable lead made it more difficult for the writers to develop either Kassandra or Alexios as their own characters in response to the Bloomberg report by Schreier.

Kassandra has received near-universal critical acclaim for her characterization as an atypical female video game protagonist. With Kassandra, Ubisoft earned nominations for Outstanding Achievement in Character at the 22nd Annual D.I.C.E. Awards, and Best Character at the Italian Video Game Awards. Mahut received award nominations from 15th British Academy Games Awards, and The Game Awards 2018, for her performance as Kassandra. Kassandra has also appeared on several "top character" lists with high placements. Paste Magazine named her among the best new videogame characters of 2018, and praised her down-to-earth nature, as well as her confidence and self-assuredness which is considered to be rare for video game characters. Andy Kelly from PC Gamer proclaimed her to be the second best protagonist character of the Assassin's Creed series behind Ezio Auditore da Firenze, whose mischievous charm is said to be present in Mahut's performance; and Polygon ranked Kassandra among the best video game characters of the 2010s as well as one of their "69 biggest crushes of the last decade".

Hoggins said Kassandra was for him the obvious choice as the player character. He described her as "brilliant company" who takes absolutely no nonsense from anyone, as "her tongue is much sharper than the rusty sword she begins the game with". Samuel Axon from Ars Technica said Kassandra stole the show for him, and that choosing her for his first playthrough felt like a fresh experience; he liked the notion of a female character with agency roaming ancient Greece "liberally partaking in all the violent and sensual pleasures on offer with Conan-like revelry and impunity", framing an entirely different tone and context not unlike that of Xena: Warrior Princess. Writing for PC Gamer, Fraser Brown formed the view that Kassandra is "immediately likeable" due to her "easy-going, roguish charm", and compared her "longstanding popularity" to that of Geralt of Rivia from The Witcher media franchise which end up overshadowing the Assassin's Creed series' other protagonists. Harry Shepard, also from PC Gamer, noted that her "commanding presence oozes cool, and she has a more subtle charm" compared to her male counterpart. Colin Campbell from Polygon praised Kassandra as "one of the most complete human characters" he has ever played as in a game, noting that she comes across as "smarter and funnier" then her male counterpart, and that "her facial animations are a joy to watch, while her vocal reactions generally match her movements". Campbell's credited Mahut's performance for giving the role a greater range than Alexios’ actor. Noelle Adams from Critical Hit praised Kassandra as a physically strong and tough survivor who combines likeable traits from many other female protagonists in fiction and yet has a malleable personality, in addition to being better animated then her male counterpart. Her portrayal as an example of a liberated Spartan female archetype, as well as a potential bisexual or queer protagonist has also been praised.

Alexios has also received a generally positive reception, though he often draws an unfavorable comparison to his female counterpart. Kelly considered Alexios to be well acted, but felt that Antonakos played him "far too straight", which in his opinion failed to differentiate the character from "a dozen other gruff videogame heroes". Shepard said he chose to play as Alexios as he preferred his character design as well as Antonakos' delivery of the profane word malaka, and felt he could better relate to Alexios due to their perceived visual similarities, though he accepted that his personality "is a bit flat" when compared to Kassandra's. Campbell said Alexios has a depth of character who is "as good as the gruffly vengeful Bayek", but commented that Antonakos' interpretation of the character comes across to him as a "cut-out Mediterranean macho hero, almost to the point of parody", with the "aura of a comedically self-important cartoon character". Axon said playing as Alexios felt like the same framing he has experienced in video games hundreds of times before, including every mainline Assassin's Creed game except Syndicate. Andy Kim from US Gamer reacted negatively to Phillips' sharing of player data which is skewed towards Alexios, and joked that two-thirds of the game's player base made the incorrect choice.
