= Myia =

Greek philosopher

Myia (/ˈmaɪ.ə/; Ancient Greek: Μυῖα, literally "Fly"; fl. c. 500 BC) was a Pythagorean philosopher and, according to later tradition, one of the daughters of Theano and Pythagoras.

== Life ==
Myia was married to Milo of Croton, the famous athlete. She was a choir leader as a girl, and as a woman she was noted for her exemplary religious behaviour. Lucian, in his In Praise of a Fly, states that he could say many things about Myia the Pythagorean were it not for the fact that her history is known to everyone.

One letter attributed to Myia is still extant. It is spurious, and probably dates from the 3rd or 2nd century BC. The letter is addressed to a certain Phyllis, and discusses the importance of fulfilling the needs of a newborn baby according to the principle of harmony. According to the writer, a baby naturally desires moderation in all things, such as food, clothing, heating, etc., and a nurse of that baby must be moderate also.
