= Transmog =

Feature to change the appearance of items

The in-game Transmogrification interface of the 2018 video game, Assassin's Creed: Odyssey.

Transmog (short for transmogrification, sometimes called visual customisation), is a video game feature which allows a player to change the appearance of their equipped armour or weapons to match another item, while keeping the original item's stats.

When applied to weapons, Transmogrification is typically limited to weapons within the same class. A sword, for example, may take on the appearance of any other sword, but not the appearance of a bow.

== Transmogrification Systems ==
The specific implementation of Transmogrification in a video game varies greatly with developer intent; ranging from Free, to Limited, to Monetised Transmogrification. It also varies in how it applies to the character or item mechanically:

- Slot-based: Transmogrification which applies to an overall slot on the character, such as their helmet slot. With this system, equipping a different helmet for its stats will not impact the appearance of the character.
- Loadout-based: Transmogrification which applies to an overall slot for one specific gear loadout. Similar to slot-based Transmogrification, this will allow the player to equip different items for their stats without impacting their character's appearance; it will also allow them to save these appearances separately across different loadouts which can be customised independently.
- Item-based: Transmogrification which applies to a specific item, such as one helmet. With this system, equipping a different helmet for its stats will require the player to apply their Transmogrification again to the new helmet. If a new appearance is used, then swapping back to the original helmet would revert to its original Transmogrified appearance, requiring the player to Transmogrify it again to keep their latest chosen appearance.

=== Free Transmogrification ===
Games such as Assassin's Creed: Odyssey and Hogwarts Legacy feature free and limitless Transmogrification, wherein an item's appearance is instantly added to a collection or compendium upon looting said item. The player may then enter their inventory and apply this appearance to their character at any time, at no cost.

=== Limited Transmogrification ===
Certain games, whilst not monetising their Transmogrification system, will introduce in-game limitations to prevent the player from accessing Transmogrification as freely as they otherwise would. One such example is Assassin's Creed: Valhalla, which differs from its predecessor Odyssey in two key ways:

- Transmogrification can no longer be performed from the Inventory, and the player must travel back to their home town of Ravensthorpe each time they wish to equip a different appearance.
- Transmogrification is no longer free, and costs an arbitrary sum of 50 Silver, Valhalla's in-game currency, each time the player wishes to equip a different appearance.

As an example of a different limitation, Avowed allows the player to Transmogrify their outfit, but only if the item used for its appearance is actively held in the inventory - impacting the player's inventory weight. Transmogrification in Avowed may also only be used to customise armour, not weapons.

=== Monetised Transmogrification ===
Some games, such as Destiny 2, monetise Transmogrification by limiting the player's ability to equip appearances onto their character behind either a significant grind, a limited quantity within a particular time frame, or both; whilst offering players the option to forego these limitations at the cost of microtransactions.

Other games, such as Soulframe, offer Transmogrification solely as a premium feature which must be purchased via microtransaction.

== List of Video Games Featuring Transmogrification ==
Where Transmogrification was introduced as post-launch content, this list shall feature the name and release year of the relevant update or expansion where applicable.

Year	Title	Transmog System	Transmog Added	Limitations
2008	Lord of the Rings: Online - Book 12: The Ashen Wastes	Free	Post-Launch	
2009	FusionFall - Dexlabs Upgrade 1: Speed and Style	Limited	Post-Launch	Combining items in a 'Croc Pot' has a success rate based on the difference in level between the two items, the closer in level they are, the higher the chance of a successful combination. Every combination also costs 'taros', the in-game currency. Combined items also cannot be traded with other players.
2009	Earth Eternal	Free	At Launch	
2011	World of Warcraft: Cataclysm	Limited	Post-Launch	In order to 'soulbind' an item, making it available for Transmogrification, the player must visit one of a number of specific NPCs, and pay a quantity of Gold, one of World of Warcraft's in-game currencies.
2011	Terraria	Free	Post-Launch	
2013	Final Fantasy XIV: A Realm Reborn	Limited	Post-Launch	Introduced in 2.2, the "Glamour" system allows the player to change the appearance of gear at the cost of a "Glamour Prism", and create sets with "Glamour Plates". For a piece of gear's appearance to be applied over another one, it must be part of the player's inventory, or in the case of Glamour Plates, in the "Glamour Dresser".
2014	Diablo III: Reaper of Souls	Limited	Post-Launch	Transmogrification costs Gold, the in-game currency of Diablo III.
2019	Assassin's Creed: Odyssey v1.0.7	Free	Post-Launch	
2020	Tom Clancy's The Division 2: Title Update 11	Limited	Post-Launch	Whilst Transmog may be freely applied, 'Exotic' clothing is not included in The Division 2's Appearance Mods system. This means for all Exotic outfit pieces, players may neither change their appearance, nor change other gear to appear like them.
2021	Assassin's Creed: Valhalla v1.2.0	Limited	Post-Launch	Transmogrification cannot be performed from the Inventory, and the player must travel back to their home town each time they wish to equip a different appearance. Transmogrification is not free, and costs an arbitrary sum of 50 Silver, Valhalla's in-game currency, each time the player wishes to equip a different appearance.
2021	Destiny 2: Season of the Splicer	Monetised	Post-Launch	Transmogrification is limited behind a grind and seasonal limit, and is monetised in order to forego these limitations.
2021	Monster Hunter Rise	Free	At Launch	Whilst Monster Hunter Rise released with an initial 'Layered Armor' system, not all sets were available for Transmog at launch, and it was only with the release of Sunbreak Title Update 2 in September 2022 that Rise's Transmog system extended to its weapons.
2021	Outriders	Free	Post-Launch	
2022	Cyberpunk 2077 v1.6	Free	Post-Launch	
2022	God of War Ragnarök	Free	At Launch	Previously, players had to upgrade items to Power Level 9 in order to apply Transmog. With Patch 6.002, this was adjusted to allow Transmog to be performed at any time.
2023	Diablo IV	Free	At Launch	Transmogrification is free to unlock and apply. Of note, however, is that additional wardrobe slots may be purchased using Gold, the in-game currency of Diablo IV.
2025	Assassin's Creed Shadows	Free	At Launch	
2025	Avowed	Limited	At Launch	The player may Transmogrify their outfit, but only if the item used for its appearance is actively held in the inventory - impacting the player's inventory weight. Transmogrification may also only be used to customise armour, not weapons.
2026	Limbus Company - 2026, Mar. 12th Update	Limited	Post-Launch	Façade Projection, introduced with the 2026, Mar. 12th Scheduled Update, allows the player to Transmogrify 'Sinner Identities'; but to do so, the player must spend an in-game resource known as Threadskein.
2026	The Witcher 3: Wild Hunt (Remaster)	Limited	Post-Launch	Since the Remaster update, the player can visit one of the two 'master smiths' available in the game and spend in-game currency to Transmogrify.
TBD	Soulframe	Monetised	At Launch	Transmog - referred to as 'Bestitching' - uses a resource called Moonsteel Thread, purchased via microtransaction using the game's premium currency, Arcs. Transmog is not yet available for Weapons or Pacts, though both have been confirmed as upcoming content.
