= IOF =

IOF may refer to:

- Institute for the Oceans and Fisheries (IOF) at The University of British Columbia UBC Institute for the Oceans and Fisheries
- Fraunhofer IOF, the Fraunhofer Institute for Applied Optics and Precision Engineering
- Independent Order of Foresters
- Infraorbital foramen, an opening in the skull under the eye socket
- Institute of Forestry, a forestry-related technical institute under Tribhuvan University, Nepal's largest academic institution
- Institute of Frescography, an institute for fresco and mural art
- Chartered Institute of Fundraising
- International Orienteering Federation
- International Osteoporosis Foundation, a global alliance of organizations concerned with osteoporosis and metabolic bone disease
