= Eckart Witzigmann =

Austrian chef

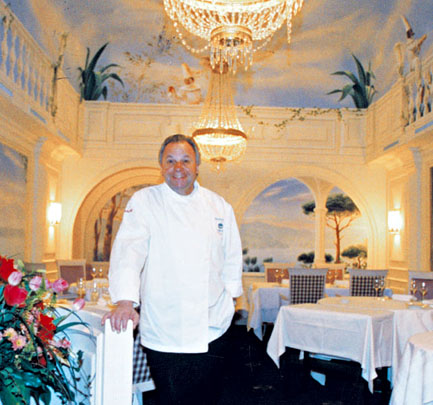
Eckart Witzigmann at the Aubergine in Munich, behind him murals by Rainer Maria Latzke

Eckart Witzigmann is an Austrian chef.

== Training ==
After his chef-apprenticeship in the Hotel Straubinger in Bad Gastein (1957–1960), Witzigmann moved on to numerous positions in prestigious restaurants around the world, among others as a student of Paul Bocuse in Lyon, France.

== Tantris ==
His work in Germany began in 1970 at the Munich restaurant Tantris designed by the architect Justus Dahinden.

== Michelin Guide ==
On 19 November 1978, he became the first German-speaking chef and the third outside France to receive the esteemed three stars from the French Michelin Guide for his Munich restaurant Aubergine which he had opened one year previously.

== Aubergine ==
In 1994, he sold the Aubergine after its licence was revoked following Witzigmann's conviction for cocaine possession. In the same year, he received the rare award chef of the century from the Gault Millau guide. Only three other chefs have been awarded this title: Paul Bocuse, Joël Robuchon and Frédy Girardet.

Since then, Witzigmann has published many cookbooks.
