= Rainer Maria Latzke =

German painter

- Rainer Maria Latzke while being interviewed by Shijue.me/Visual China
- Born: 28 December 1950 (age 75); Frohngau, Germany
- Education: University of Mainz, Academy of Fine Arts, Duesseldorf
- Known for: Painting, Muralist,
- Movement: Surrealism, Renaissance art, Trompe-l'œil, Mural painting

Rainer Maria Latzke (born 28 December 1950) is a German artist working in the field of trompe-l'œil and mural painting. He taught at the Utah State University and is founder of the Institute of Frescography. Latzke is Honorary Professor of the Fudan University, Shanghai and Guest Professor of the Shanghai Institute of Visual Art . Latzke was ranked one of the 12 cultural trendsetters of the 1990s by Forbes and one of the world's best artists of the last four centuries by the Artists Trade Union of Russia. He is a cousin of Poland´s wealthiest entrepreneur Jan Kulczyk.

== Life ==
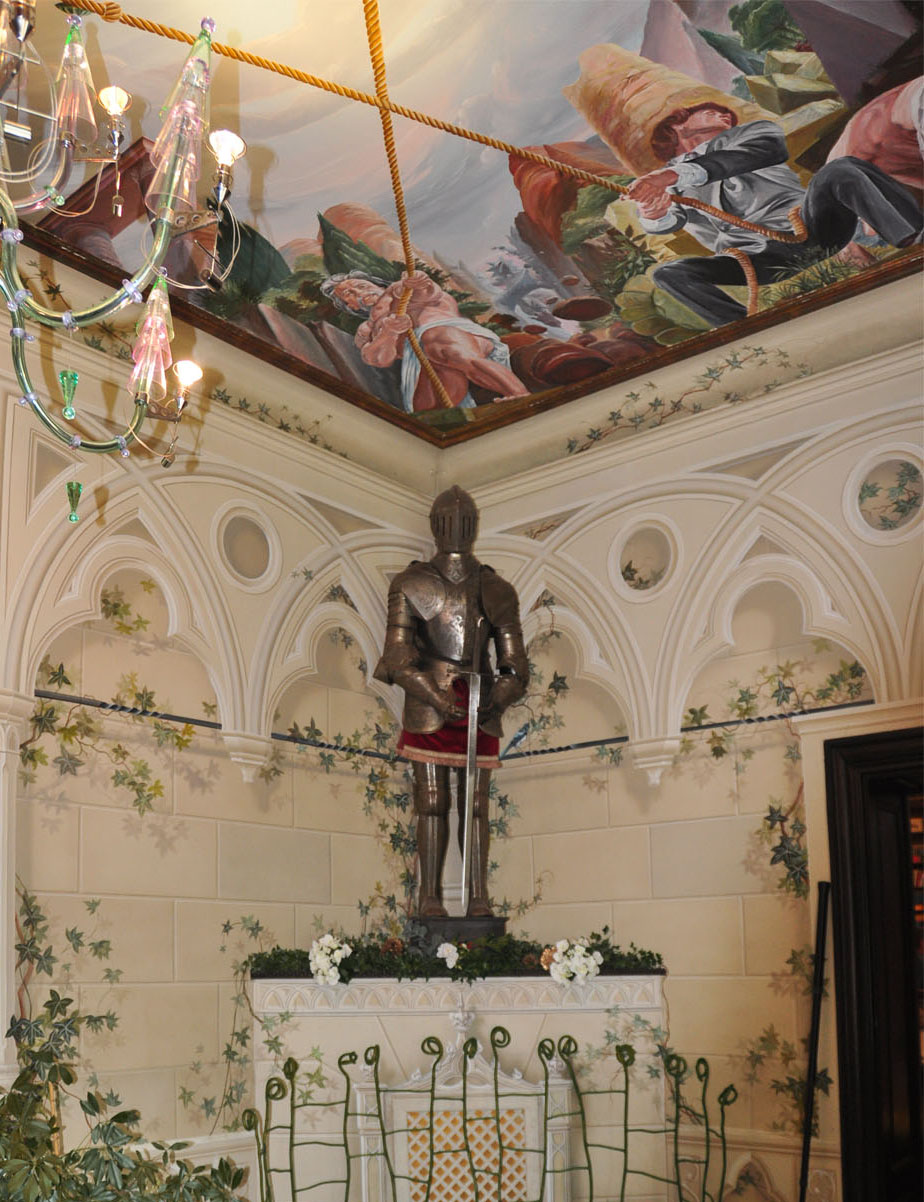
Rainer Maria Latzke, wall and ceiling painting, entrance hall of Chateau Thal, Belgium

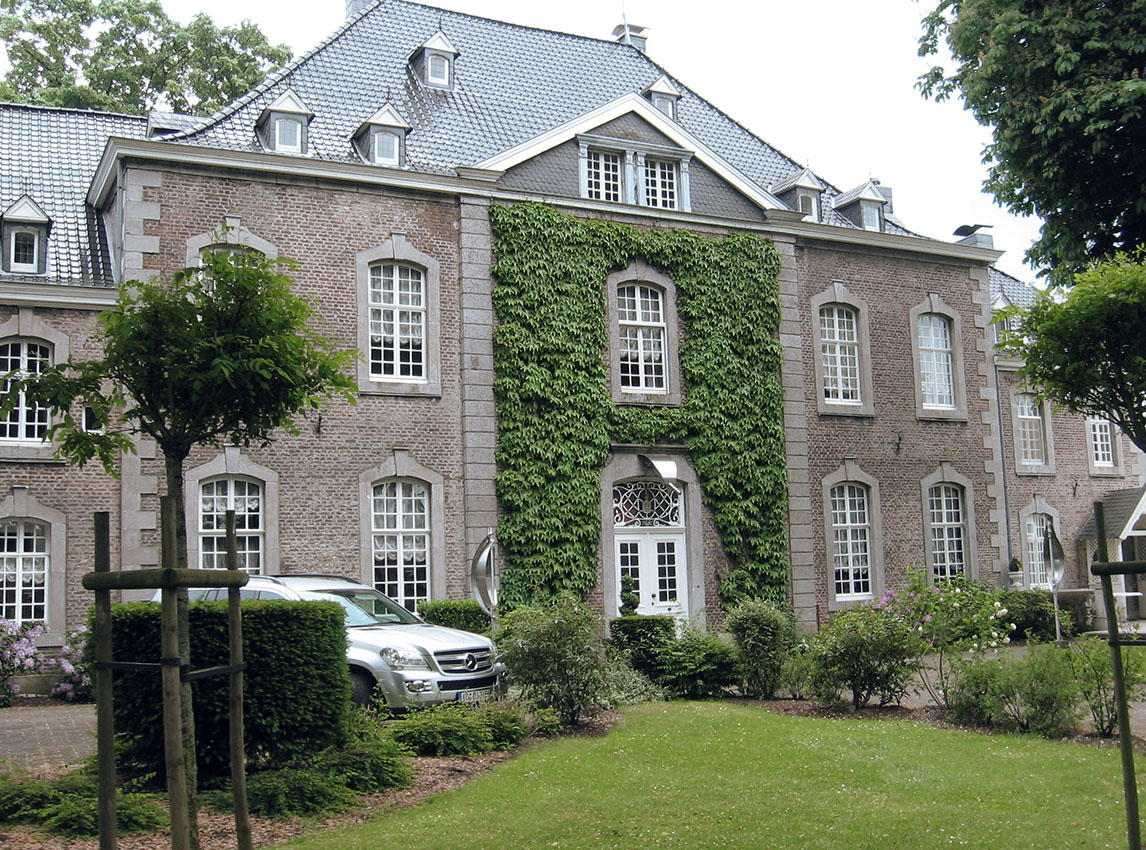
Chateau Thal, front view

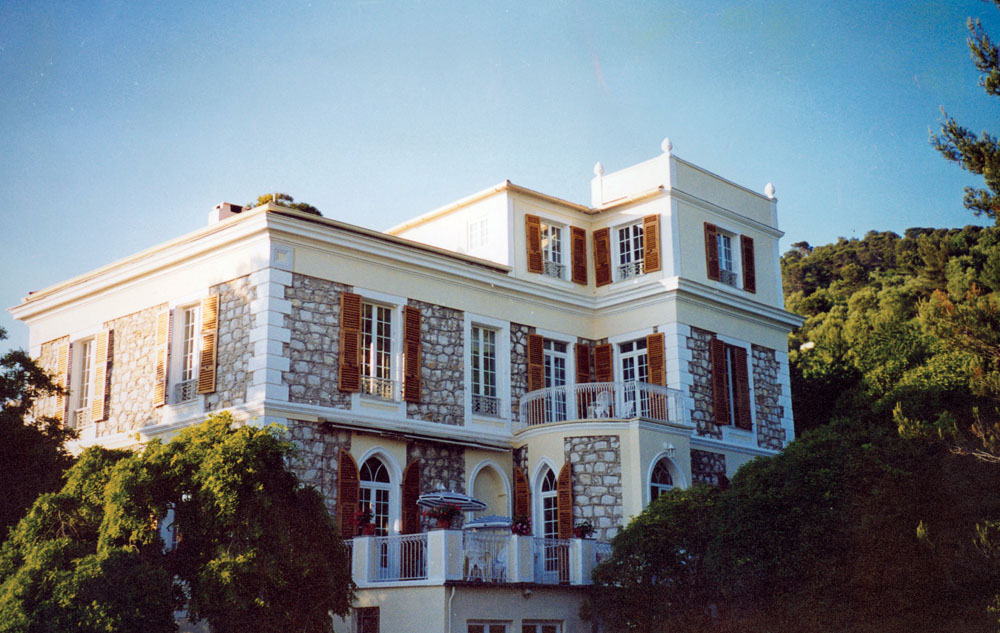
Villa Paradou, Cap Ferrat, France

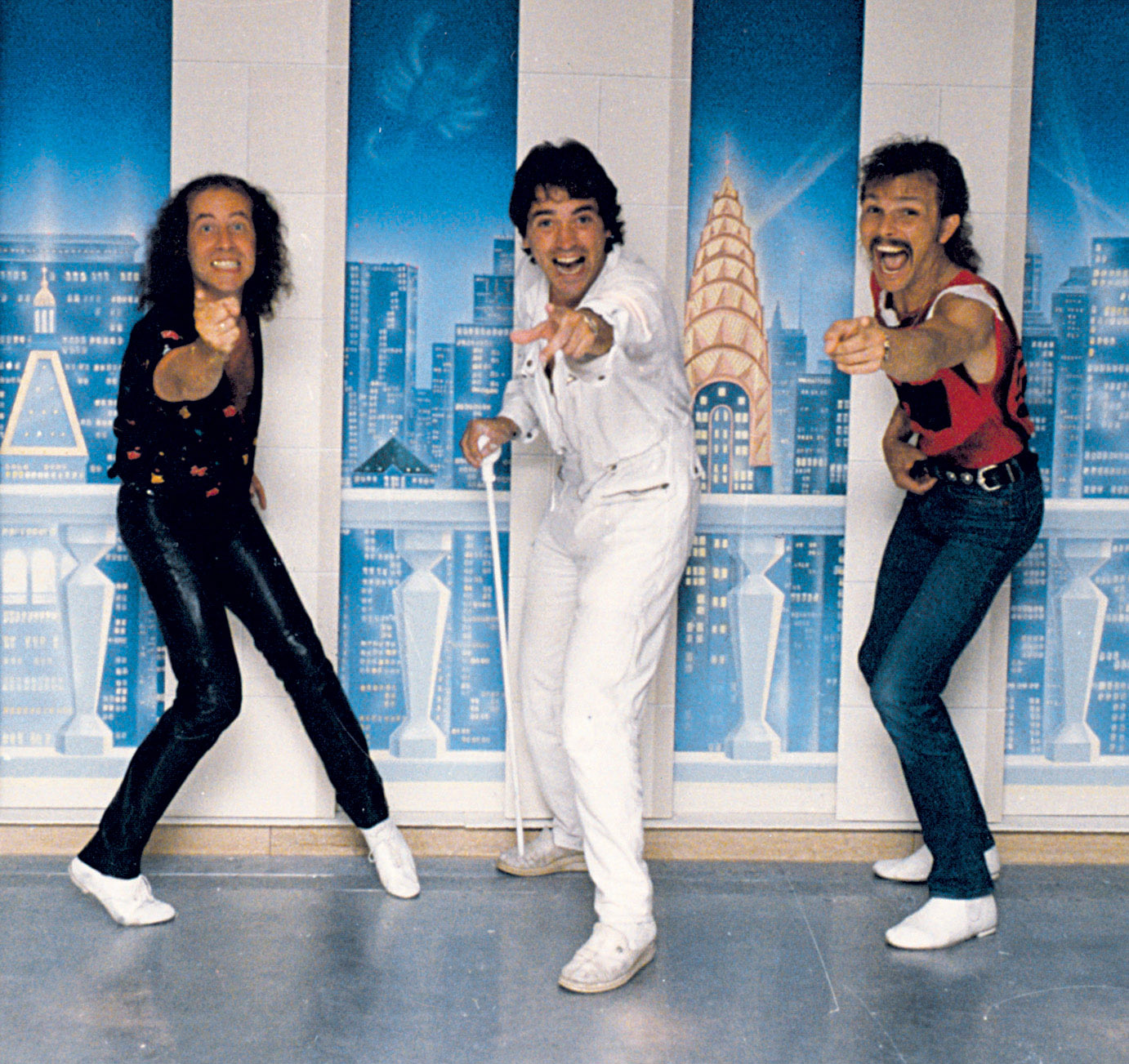
Klaus Meine, R. M. Latzke and Rudolf Schenker in front of Latzke´s mural in the Scorpions' studio.

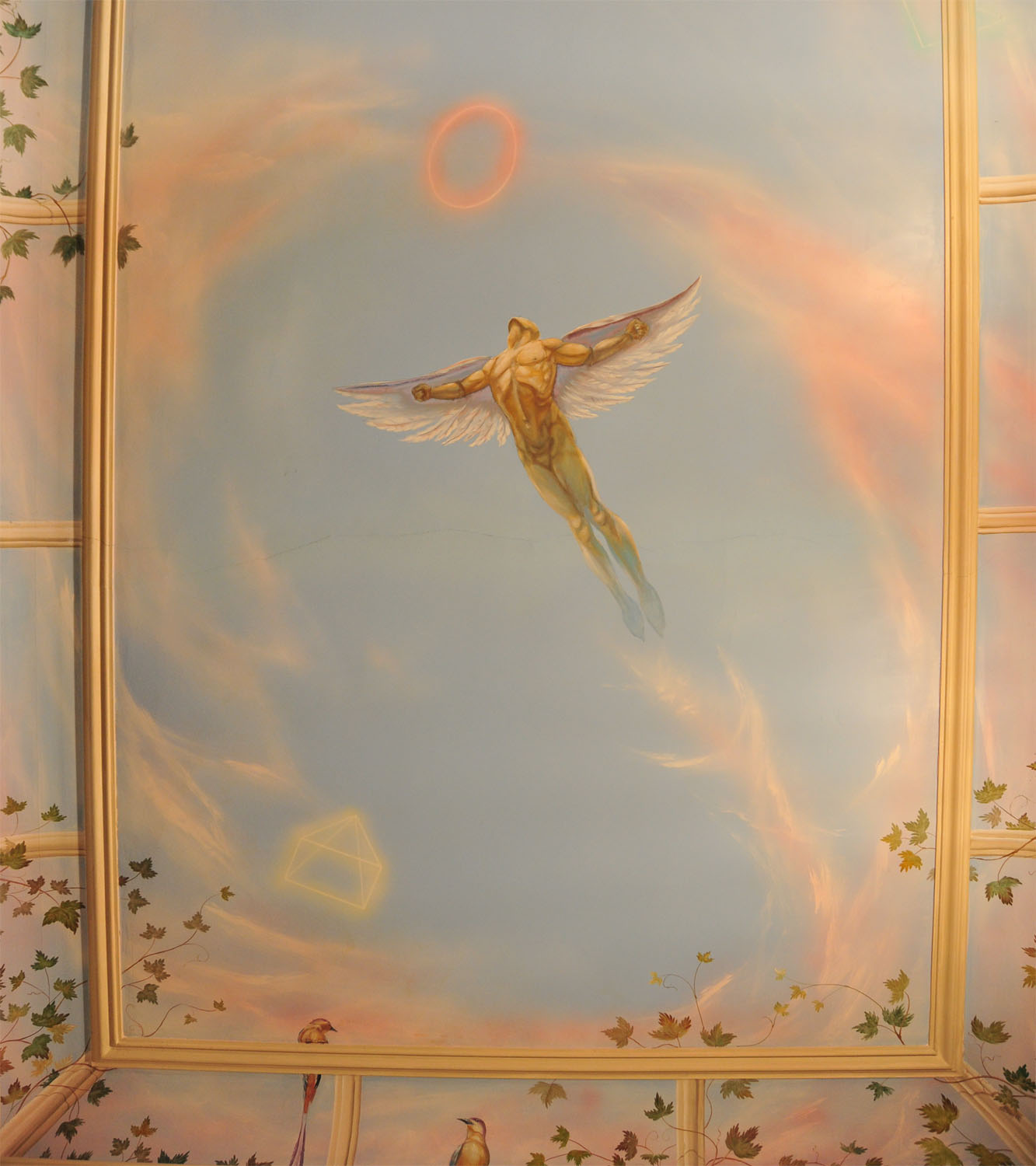
Icarus, ceiling painting by Rainer Maria Latzke, Chateau Thal, Belgium, 1986

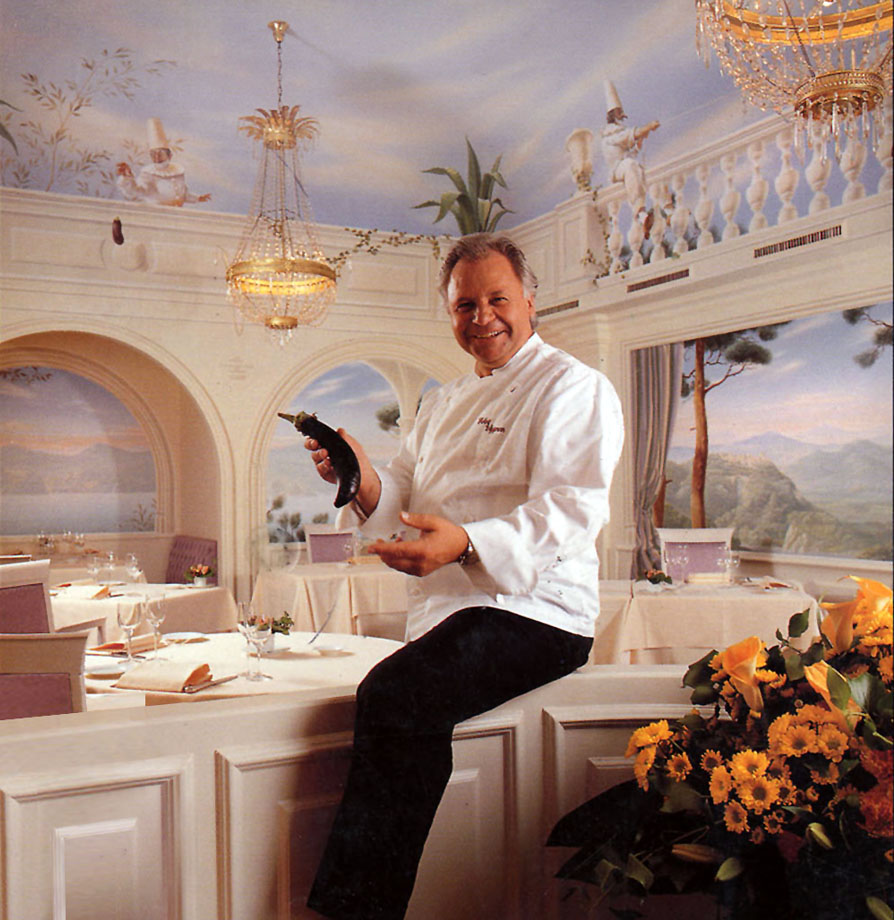
Eckart Witzigmann at the "Aubergine" in front of Latzke´s murals

Rainer Maria Latzke was born in Germany in 1950. He was raised near Cologne along with his 8 siblings by his father Alfons, an art teacher, and his mother Lisa, who was also an artist. His father´s family comes from Poland, while his mother was a Kohlschütter, a family of famous scientists such as Arnold and Ernst Kohlschütter. Latzke studied art, philosophy, and educational science at Johannes Gutenberg University in Mainz Germany, and then continued his art studies at the Düsseldorf Academy of Fine Arts under the supervision of Joseph Beuys and Gerhard Richter from 1972 to 1976.

In 1974 he earned a master's degree in pedagogy and philosophy and in 1976 he earned a master's degree in art. After teaching art for two years, he quit and traveled to Italy in 1980 where he studied Renaissance painting techniques and fresco painting in Florence and Rome.

In 1981 he married Doris Boecke, with whom he had three children, Rene Marcus (born 1981), who is married to English artist Paula Hammond, Katharina Maria (born 1983) and Maurice Amadeus (born 1985). In 2008 his first grandchild, Tristan Francis, was born to Katharina, who is married to US citizen Paul Smith.

In 1982 his career as a muralist started to advance: His collaboration with Harrods in London opened doors to prominent clients, like royal families in the Middle East. He worked for Mercedes-Benz, for whom he designed the artwork for their 100-year celebration exhibition "Welt Mobil", and prominent rock bands like The Scorpions, for whom he created the computer-controlled electronic mural "Night over Manhattan". In 1992 he was featured by the European issue of Forbes magazine in the article "Stars of tomorrow – cultural trendsetters with major input of the decade".

In 1984 Latzke acquired the 1760 built "Chateau Thal" in Belgium and restored the 38-room castle as well decorated it with numerous murals. He taught mural painting to apprentices in the castle's studio, who later opened their own wall painting studios which led to a new Renaissance of wall painting in contemporary Interior Design.

After his move to Monte Carlo in 1995, he acquired the "Villa Paradou" the former residence of late Henri Chrétien, the Oscar-winning inventor of the Cinemascope technique, in 1998. The villa, built by French architect Charles Garnier was due to after being abandoned for a longer time in very poor condition. Latzke refurbished the estate consisting of two buildings situated in an overgrown park and restored the existing wall paintings. In 1998 he published the book "Traumwelten – Die Kunst der Dritten Dimension" and in 1990 "Dreamworlds, the making of a room with illusionary painting".

In the Villa Paradou he also continued his work in developing new techniques for the production and reproduction of murals, which he had started in Belgium in 1988 with the "Artscape" technique. In 2000 he was awarded a patent for his invention of the Frescography. He also engaged himself in music, composing songs and lyrics, and worked together with South France studio musicians and Phil Palmer, who also worked with Roger Daltrey, and the Dire Straits.

In 2009 Latzke founded the Institute of Frescography, a research and educational nonprofit organization for mural art.

== Frescography ==
In the late 1980s Rainer Maria Latzke began to develop new techniques for the production of murals, which led to the invention of the Frescography and the CAM Software. This patented technique consists of a computer programme, the Dreamworlds Design Studio, which allows the user to assemble individual mural designs using a large selection of cut-out images. Prior to starting a design the dimensions of the wall are entered into the software to create a workspace reflecting the project wall. The designs are then transferred in the artist's studio onto a single canvas in wall size and then attached on site using a similar procedure as with wallpaper. Frescographies take only a few hours to design on the computer, and are produced and delivered within a short period of time (2– 4 weeks). Retailers advertise that the product is as close as possible to a perfect mural. It is currently being sold by over 300 franchisees in Europe. Frescographies can be seen in public buildings such as the Vienna Rathaus (Vienna Town Hall) or the world's largest sailboat, the Royal Clipper. There are currently around 300 dealers in Europe distributing Latzke's Frescographies under the brand name Frescomaster.

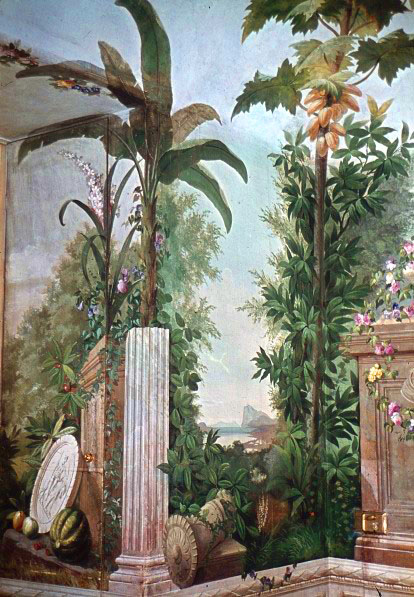
J.W. Bergl Schloss Schönbrunn Vienna, Austria, 1770, Archive of European wall and ceiling paintings

=== Institute of Frescography ===
In 2009 Rainer Maria Latzke founded the Institute of Frescography (IOF). The IOF is an officially recognized (NFP) institution; its mission is the improvement of public knowledge and interest in the art of mural and fresco painting. It also researches on art history, digital reproduction, printing processes and materials, and restoration techniques of mural art.

In cooperation with the German Zentralinstitut für Kunstgeschichte the IOF houses a 40,000 images archive of European wall and mural paintings. The archive covers the period between the Gothic ages to the end of the 19th century. Another IOF archive, the "World of Ornaments" consists of 5,000 motifs based on the two greatest encyclopedic collections of ornament from the 19th century chromo-lithographic tradition: Auguste Racinet's L"'Ornement polychrome Volumes I and II" from 1875–1888 and "M. Dupont-Auberville's L'Ornement des tissus" from 1877.

The IOF also is participating in museum and exhibition projects of mural and fresco art. The institute has a subsidiary at the campus of the Shanghai Institute of Visual Art in the Songjiang University Town, Shanghai, China.

== Works ==
- "Welt Mobil" Exhibition, Daimler Benz AG, 1984
- Chateau Thal, Kettenis, Belgium, 1986–2000.
- "Night over Manhattan", The Scorpions´Studio, 1987
- Convent Andechs´"Andechser at the Dome", Bavaria/Germany, 1994
- Çırağan Palace, Istanbul, Turkey, 1995
- Eckard Witzigmann's "Aubergine", Munich, Germany, 1993
- Mario Gamba's "Acquarello", Munich, Germany 1994
- Villa Paradou, Cote d´Azur, France, 1998
- The "Royal Clipper", 2000
- Lanner Lehár Hall, Vienna Town Hall, Austria, 2005

== Honors and awards ==
- Master Student of the Academy of Fine Arts Düsseldorf, 1977
- Patent für ein großflächiges Wandbild, 1990
- Forbes magazine: "Stars of Tomorrow – Cultural Trendsetters with Input of the Decade", 1992
- Patent for the Fresography technique, 2000
- Honorary Professor of the Fudan University, 2010
- Master of the DeTao Masters Academy, 2010

== Publications ==
- "Traumwelten – die Kunst der dritten Dimension" (publ. 1998)
- "Dreamworlds – the Making of a Room with Illusionary Painting" (publ. 1999).
