= Noni Olabisi =

American painter and muralist (1954–2022)

Noni Olabisi (August 9, 1954 – March 1, 2022) was a painter and muralist. Her murals include To Protect and Serve (1996), which depicts the history of the Black Panther Party and addresses the history of police brutality. Her first mural, created in 1992, was Freedom Won't Wait, painted after the acquittal of the officers who beat Rodney King and the violence that ensued across the city of Los Angeles.

== Biography ==
Born in St. Louis in 1954, Olabisi lived in Arkansas as a child before her family relocated to Los Angeles. She began making art while attending Horace Mann Junior High School, and eventually earned an Associate Arts Degree from Los Angeles Southwest College. Her first mural commission, from the Social and Public Art Resource Center, came about after she filled out a questionnaire for emerging muralists.

Olabisi's 1996 mural To Protect and Serve proved divisive; city stipulations on the mural that were "dangerously close to censorship" dragged out the mural's completion for two years, and it was ultimately funded only by SPARC and by public donations. Shortly after its completion, the crew of the Showtime movie Riot covered up the mural because Olabisi objected to its use in the background of a scene; Olabisi claimed the crew defaced the mural in the process. Speaking on the mural in 1997, Olabisi stated: "This mural commemorates the Black Panther Party and its unforgettable contribution to African American history. And the mural is dedicated to all political prisoners, as well as those who lost their lives fighting for truth, justice and freedom. The spirit of these brothers and sisters cannot and will not die. ALL POWER TO THE PEOPLE!"

In September 2021 Olabisi worked with fellow Los Angeles artist Luis Mateo and 21 local students to create art for the construction fence around the future site of the Lucas Museum of Narrative Art.

In October 2021 she began a residency at Blue Roof Artist Studios, where she began transitioning from painting on walls to painting on canvas.

Olabisi died suddenly in February 2022, shortly after completing her residency at Blue Roof. Fellow Los Angeles artist Dominique Moody commented on her recent work in her obituary, saying "Her mural work is very dynamic and powerful... In Olabisi's new body of work, her figures are ethereal, almost indiscernible. It's as if she captured spirit."

== Legacy ==
In 2023 the locations of Olabisi's murals were added to the Cultural Treasures of South Los Angeles, a mapping and database initiative produced by the City of Los Angeles Department of Cultural Affairs.

A posthumous retrospective of Noni Olabisi's work was organized at Loyola Marymount University's Laband Art Gallery. The exhibition "Noni Olabisi: When Lightning Strikes" was on view from January 29 through April 4, 2026, and was curated by Karen Rapp. A catalogue will be released in fall 2026.
