= Computer-aided mural =

Computer-aided mural (CAM) is the use of computer technology for designing mural art and wall decoration resulting in the frescography procedure, which was invented in 1998 by German muralist Rainer Maria Latzke. CAM may be used to design completely individual illusionary or decorative mural art. It is especially useful for artists who re-use certain images in each project, but also for people who cannot draw or paint at all.

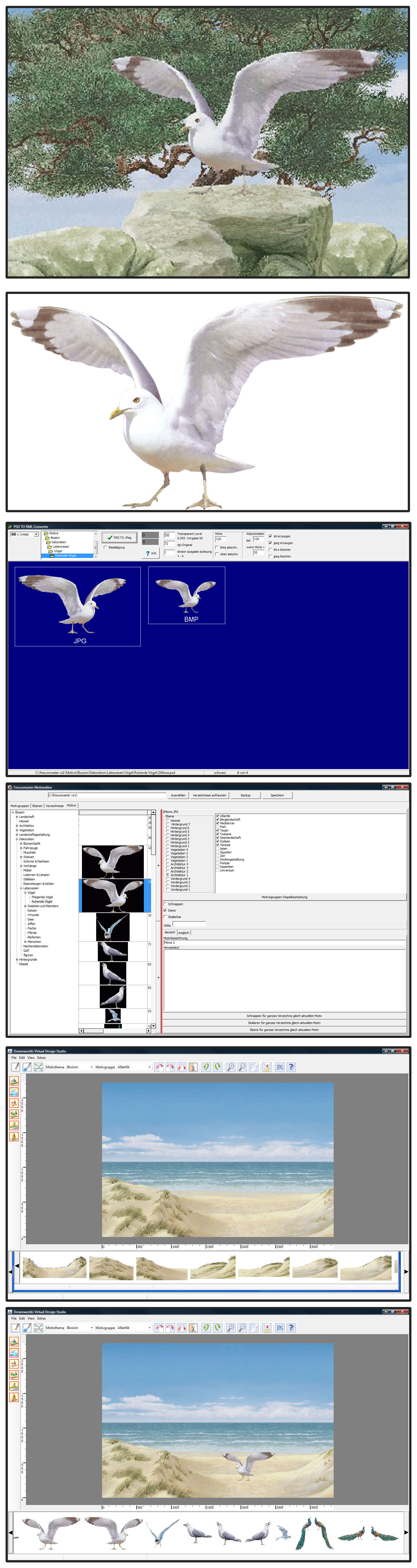
Procedure for a CAM design (screenshots): 1.Step: Cut out motiv. 2.Step: Convert into smaller sizes for composition. 3.Store into database and define properties. 4.create CAM design

== Properties of CAM ==
When starting a new project CAM software requests a user to fill in measurements, these will usually be of the wall which the frescography is later mounted to. Once the project has been created the user may choose from a library of images which are categorized into themes and motives. The library will either be filled with content by the user himself, or the user can purchase a CAM software which is already filled by the manufacturer, the Dreamworlds Design Studio. The user creates designs by placing the motifs on the workspace. By giving the motifs layer attributes, it is possible to put image elements such as skies or oceans in the background and a beach or vegetation in the foreground. With additional options such as re-sizing and cropping individual motifs, a design gains depth and realistic proportions.

To avoid long waiting times when selecting new motifs CAM software uses low-resolution preview images. These are often only a hundredth of the original size, yet still large enough on a computer screen. After a design is completed it is converted into a PSD where each motif is automatically placed into its own layer to allow further changes and editing to be made with Adobe Systems's Photoshop.

== History and development ==
In the past, standard image editing software such as Photoshop or Illustrator were used to digitally create wall decoration such as theatre backdrops or billboards. The market for this type of art was scarce due to computers being expensive, and not being able to cope with the high resolution image files. Only recent advances in computer and hardware technology allow artists to scan and print their work in very high and detailed quality.

The last hurdle for artists to overcome was the large size a high-resolution image would produce. Even though there are no more problems cutting out individual images- to actually assemble several large images to create a design is still a challenge. That is why CAM software not only works as design software, but is also a data management tool. In the front-office of the software the user will be working with low resolution files (GIF or PNG to keep transparency). Once a design is finished it is rendered or converted back into a PSD file using the images maximum resolution and converting their color-coding from RGB to CMYK.

== Computer hardware and operating systems ==
Today most Computer-Aided Mural software runs on Windows based PCs. Recent development in Emulator technologies and Apple's switch to Intel based hardware provide the option of running CAM software on Apple computers. Because CAM software used low-resolution preview images while designing, there is no need for powerful computers. However developers recommend Intel Core 2 Duo technology and 2GB RAM or more.

== Printing and material ==
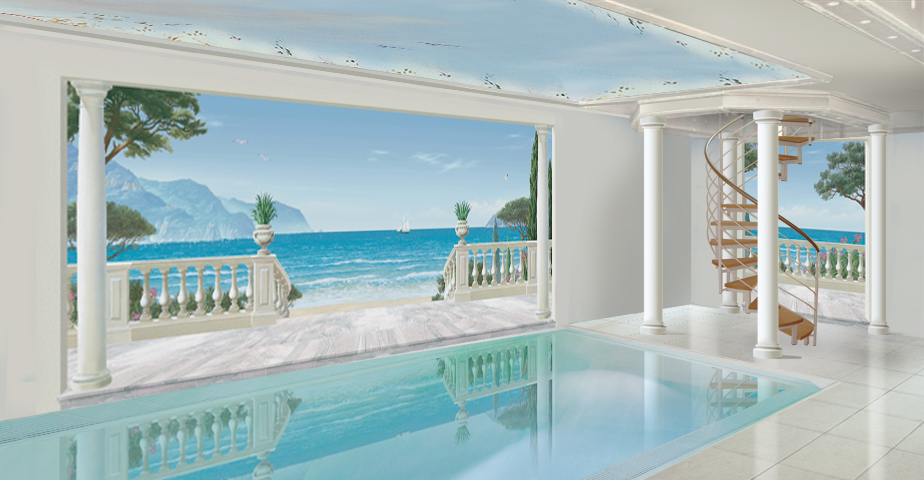
Pool with a CAM designed wall mural printed with a vutek UV printer on synthetic canvas.

A finished design is usually produced on Canvas, but depending on the printer a large variety of material may be used. With UV flatbed printers also tiles, glass and other nonflexible material can be used as support. Because of the mostly large size of the files the images are usually given in with 72 DPI but through interpolation methods appear optically like a higher resolution print.

The lifetime of the print depends on the material; however modern printers offer an anti-abrasion layer to coat the material while being printed. Additionally, invisible UV and protective coating may be applied manually to increase the products lifetime. Manufacturers state that a Frescography will last over 10 years without noticeable change.
