= Frescography =

Large-scale printing of digital images on architectural elements for placement on walls

Frescography (from Latin fresco – painting onto "fresh" plaster + Greek graphein – to write) is a method for producing murals digitally on paper, canvas, glass or tiles, invented in 1998 by German muralist Rainer Maria Latzke. Frescography uses CAM and digital printing methods to create murals.

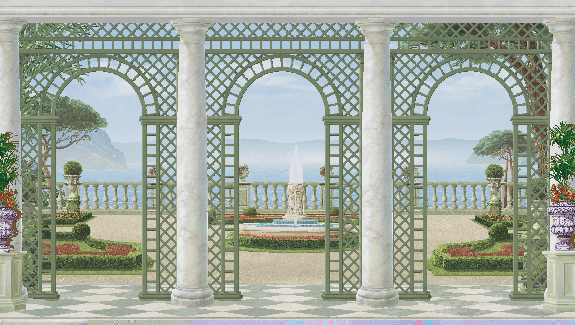
With CAM-program created frescography

== History of mural reproduction techniques ==
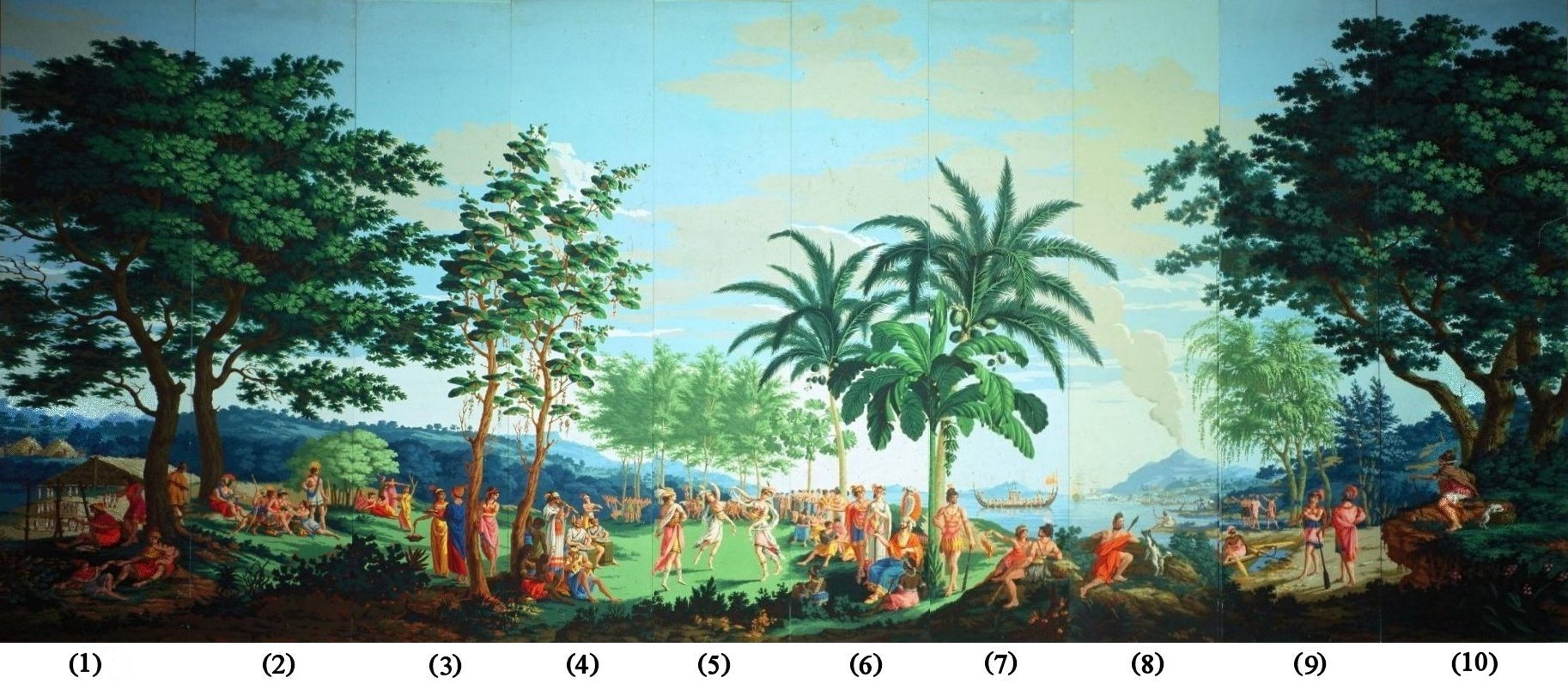
'Sauvages de la Mer Pacifique' - Unlike this woodblock print consisting of 10 stripes, the frescography is produced on a single piece of canvas, allowing a seamless mural tailor-fit to the wall's dimensions.

The frescography is based on a similar technique as the woodblock printing method of the French Papier Peints wallpapers, used by manufacturers like Zuber et cie or Joseph Dufour et Cie, who began developing the procedure during the end of the 18th century. These wallpaper manufacturers used thousands of engraved woodblocks for the creation of the panorama sceneries, to create wall paper such as the 20-panel Sauvages de la Mer du Pacifique which Jean-Gabriel Charvet designed for Joseph Dufour et Cie or the “du Vue de l'Amérique Nord” designed in 1834 by Zuber et cie for the Diplomatic Reception Room of the White House, where it is still today.

== The principle of frescography ==
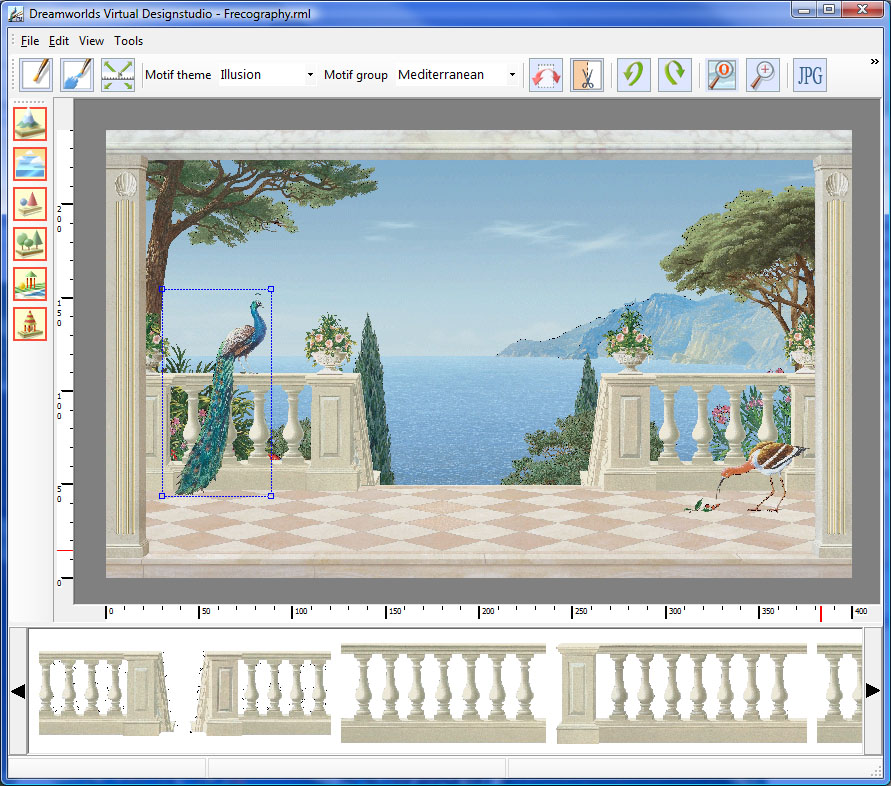
Screenshot of a CAM program for the design of frescographies.

Unlike woodblock printing, the frescography is based on digitally cut-out motifs which are stored in a database. To avoid having to work with high-resolution files on software such as Photoshop (resulting in long rendering and processing time), new CAM software programs like the Dreamworlds Design Studio allow the composition of mural designs by working with preview files which are later converted to the original resolution. By adding the exact measurements of a wall when starting a new project and even taking architectural elements such as doors windows or beams into consideration, the design will result in an accurate, tailor-fit, wall mural.

Once a design is finished, the low-resolution motifs are converted into the original high-resolution images and are printed on wide-format printers. Unlike the woodblock print consisting of stripes, the frescography is printed on a single piece of canvas, allowing a seamless mural tailor-fit to the walls dimensions. Once produced, the canvas is applied to the wall in a wall-paper-like procedure.

Since the motifs can be placed freely and scaled to the individual wall measurements, the finished piece will look like it was created on-site.

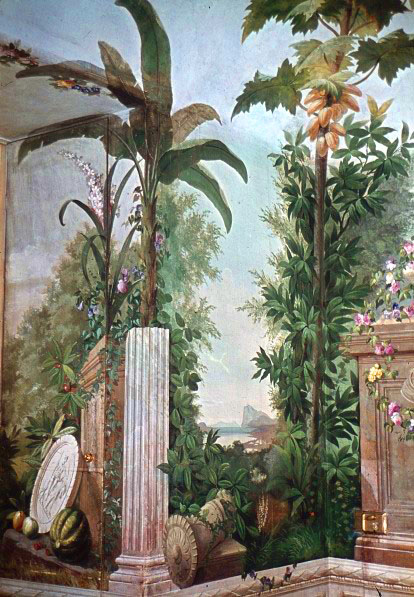
J.W. Bergl Schloss Schoenbrunn Vienna, Austria, 1770, Archive of European wall and ceiling paintings

== Institute of Frescography ==
In 2009 the inventor of the frescography technique, Professor Rainer Maria Latzke, founded the Institute of Frescography (IOF) at Utah State University in Logan, Utah. The IOF is a non-profit institution whose mission is the improvement of public knowledge and interest in the art of mural and fresco painting. It also researches art history, digital reproduction, printing processes and materials, and restoration techniques of mural art.

In cooperation with the German Zentralinstitut für Kunstgeschichte, the IOF provides online access to the collection a 40,000 images archive of European wall and mural paintings which were compiled in the last years of World War II on direct order of Adolf Hitler to preserve the images for a later reconstruction in case of war damages. It also offers free online access to the institute's "World of Ornaments": an archive of European wall and mural paintings that covers the period between the Gothic ages and the end of the 19th century. This archive consists of 5,000 motifs based on the two greatest encyclopedic collections of ornaments from the 19th-century chromo-lithographic tradition: Auguste Racinet's "L'Ornement polychrome Volumes I and II" from 1875 to 1888 and M. Dupont-Auberville's "L'Ornement des tissus" from 1877.

The IOF also is participating in museum and exhibition projects of mural and fresco art.

== Applications of frescographies ==
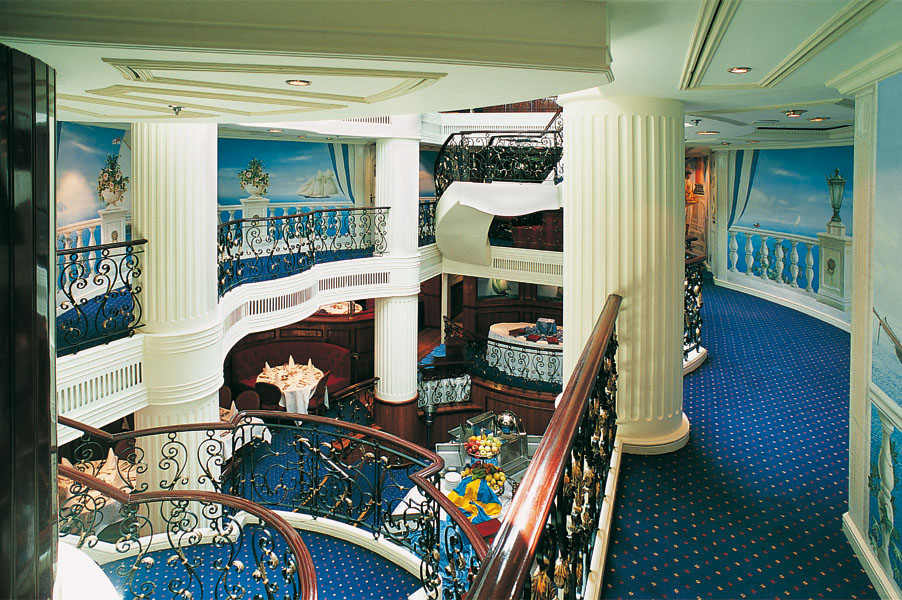
Frescographies in the lobby of the Royal Clipper.

Frescographies can be found in the Lanner Lehar Hall of the Vienna town hall or the world's largest cruising ship, Royal Clipper.

== Material and printers ==
Since frescography is based on digital printing methods, various materials are used ranging from canvas, ceramics, or glass to PVC, depending on the material the printer supports. One of the most commonly used materials is Digimura FINO 300gsm. This is mainly due to its fine-grain surface finish, which is ideal for both high-end graphics and art photography. The paper's fine raised rivulets also make it extremely well-suited to frescographies in large spaces and ambient backdrops. Commonly frescographies are printed on Wide-format printers such as Efi's Vutek printer.
