= Orient Express (disambiguation) =

Orient Express was the name of a long-distance passenger train service that ran from 1883 to 2009.

Orient Express may also refer to:

== Transportation ==
- American Orient Express, former luxury passenger train set operating in North America 1989–2008
- Venice Simplon-Orient-Express, a luxury passenger train service operating in Europe since 1982
- Orient Express (Accor), a luxury passenger train service and hospitality company operating in Europe since 2025
- MS Orient Express, former name of a cruiseferry operating in the Mediterranean 1986–1990
- Eastern & Oriental Express, a luxury passenger train service operating in Southeast Asia since 1993
- Orient Express, an automobile made by "Bergmann Industriewerken" at Gaggenau Baden in the end of the 19th century
- Orient Express, President Ronald Reagan's nickname for the Rockwell X-30 spaceplane.

== Film ==
- Orient Express (1927 film), 1927 German silent thriller film
- Orient Express (1934 film), the film version of the novel Stamboul Train
- Orient Express (1943 film), 1943 Hungarian film
- Orient Express (1944 film), 1944 German crime film
- Orient Express (1954 film), 1954 Italian film starring Eva Bartok
- Orient Express (2004 film), Romanian film

== Other uses ==
- Orient Express, nickname for poker player Johnny Chan
- "Orient Express", a single by Jean-Michel Jarre from Les Concerts en Chine
- "Orient Express", a 1967 single by the Lee Kings
- Orient Express (board game), a board game set on the train
- Orient Express (magazine), an Italian comics magazine
- Orient Express (roller coaster), a former roller coaster at Worlds of Fun in Kansas City, United States
- Orient Express (TV series), a 1953 anthology drama television series
- Orient Express Racing Team, French yacht racing team
- Orient-Express Hotels, former name of the UK-based leisure company Belmond Ltd.
- Stamboul Train, 1932 novel by Graham Greene (titled Orient Express in the US)
- The Orient Express (professional wrestling), a wrestling tag-team from the early 1990s

== See also ==
- Murder on the Orient Express, 1934 Agatha Christie novel
  - Murder on the Orient Express (disambiguation), various things based on the novel
