= SolidSail =

Wind propulsion technology for large ships

- Type: Private
- Industry: Maritime wind propulsion technology
- Founded: 2009 (first patent)
- Founder: Chantiers de l'Atlantique
- Headquarters: Saint-Nazaire, France
- Key people: Nicolas Abiven (Project Engineer)
- Products: Rigid composite sails AeolDrive rigging
- Parent: Chantiers de l'Atlantique
- Subsidiaries: SolidSail Mast Factory

SolidSail (also stylised Solid Sail ) or SolidSail Mast Factory (SMAF) in reference to the eponymous subsidiary, is a wind propulsion technology designed for large vessels, developed by Chantiers de l'Atlantique in Saint-Nazaire, France. This system is based on rigid sails made of composite materials and a tilting gaff rigging, enabling hybrid or primary wind propulsion for commercial and cruise ships. It is also the name of the subsidiary created by Chantiers de l'Atlantique in 2023.

Three SolidSail units are currently used for the propulsion systems of the longest sailing ship ever constructed (as of 2026), the Orient Express Corinthian, which is able to rely exclusively on its wind-powered propulsion in optimal conditions.

== History ==
=== Project genesis ===
The development of SolidSail is part of the Ecorizon program, launched in 2007 by Chantiers de l'Atlantique and dedicated to energy and environmental efficiency for ships. After preliminary studies, a first sailing concept ship named Eoseas was presented in 2009. It was a pentamaran passenger ship 305 meters long equipped with five masts supporting 12,440 m^{2} (133,900 sq ft) of sails, capable of sailing under wind power alone in strong winds.

The technology was the subject of two patents filed in 2009 (Eoseas patent) and 2017. The project accelerated in 2014 with research and development funding from ADEME (French Agency for Ecological Transition) as part of the Future Investment Program. The project was led by engineer and former sailor Nicolas Abiven.

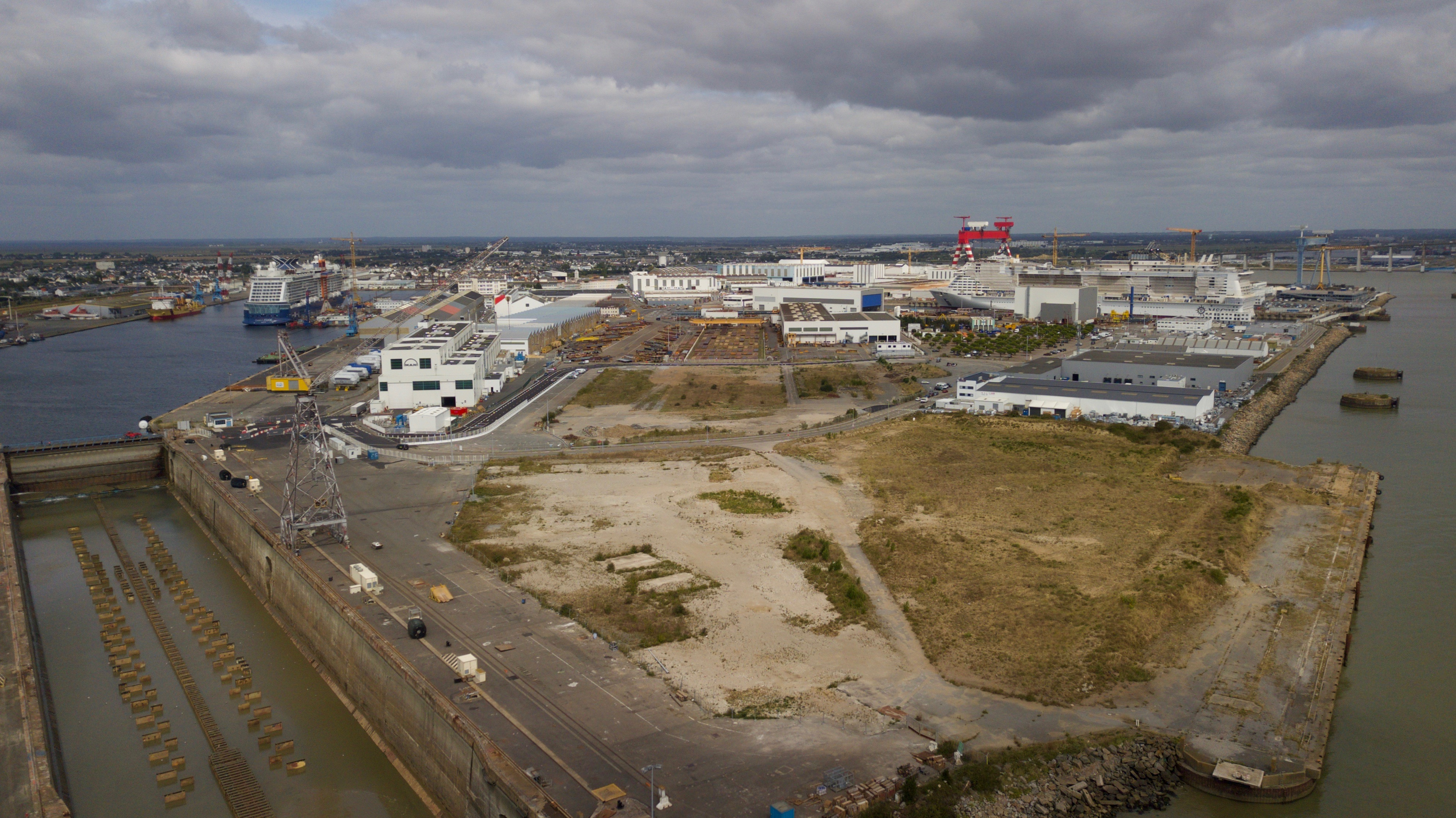
Aerial view of Chantiers de l'Atlantique in Saint-Nazaire, initiator of the project

=== Technological development ===
Between 2016 and 2019, a series of tests conducted in various conditions confirmed the viability of the concept. Chantiers de l'Atlantique then embarked on the development of an adapted rigging system, resulting in 2019 in a solution known as Solid Sail/AeolDrive.

The SOLID SAIL 2.0 research program, conducted between 2018 and 2020 by ENSTA Bretagne in collaboration with Chantiers de l'Atlantique, G-Sea Design, and Multiplast, created a fluid-structure calculation chain to precisely dimension the composites and optimize the sail geometry. This Breton consortium, certified by the Pôle Mer Bretagne Atlantique and the EMC2 cluster, brought together four main partners and five subcontractors (Awentech, Capacités SAS, Incidence, Mer Vent, Ocean Data System) for a total budget of €994,000. The program was co-financed by the European Union (ERDF) and the Brittany Region. The work, coordinated by Alain Nême (associate professor at ENSTA Bretagne), resulted in the creation of a predictive numerical model validated by tests on a 1/5th scale prototype, both on ENSTA's MASMECA platform and in Pornichet.

The results of this work were published in January 2022 in the international journal Ocean Engineering under the title "Efficient jib-mainsail fluid-structure interaction modelling – Validations with semi-rigid sails experiments" by Antoine Morvan, Matthieu Sacher, Alain Nême, Jean-Baptiste Leroux, and Christian Jochum from the Institut de Recherche Dupuy de Lôme (IRDL), as well as Nicolas Abiven from Chantiers de l'Atlantique.

A second research program, called JIB SEA, succeeded SOLID SAIL 2.0 and ran for 18 months until December 2021. It aimed to finalize the full-scale design model by taking into account additional parameters such as the influence of the jib on forces transmitted through the mainsail and UV aging. ENSTA Bretagne contributed experimental expertise and extensive knowledge on fluid-structure interactions, enabling modeling of stresses experienced by rigid panels forming the sail to predict deformations and propulsion forces.

=== Testing program ===
Validation of SolidSail technology took place in several successive phases. A first 1/10th scale prototype with a surface area of 50 m^{2} (540 sq ft) was tested in 2016 on a small J/80 sailboat in Pornichet Bay. The following year, in 2017, the upper half of the sail at 1/2 scale was tested on Jean Le Cam's 60-foot IMOCA monohull. These tests achieved 85% of the boat's speed capacity, a result considered positive given the sail's weight.

Between 2018 and 2019, the 88-meter three-masted vessel Le Ponant operated by Ponant was equipped with a 1/2 scale prototype with a surface area of 300 m^{2} (3,200 sq ft) on its foremast during its technical stop in Marseille on 25 October 2018. The ship tested this sail for one year during transatlantic crossings to the Caribbean and Cuba, under various operating conditions. Jean Emmanuel Sauvée, president of Ponant, stated: "When Chantiers de l'Atlantique proposed collaborating with us on this rigid sail technology, we were immediately interested. Le Ponant, our historic sailing ship and the company's origin, remains more than ever a flagship of our fleet, and wind propulsion is undoubtedly an energy of the future."

Simultaneously, a 1/5th scale prototype was installed and tested for two years on a jetty in Pornichet port. These tests validated the numerical models developed by ENSTA Bretagne.

=== Full-scale demonstrator ===
In February 2022, a full-scale prototype was installed at the Chantiers de l'Atlantique site in Saint-Nazaire. This demonstrator, costing €18 million with 50% public funding, comprised a 66-meter composite mast (for a total height of approximately 73 meters) and a 1,050 m^{2} (11,300 sq ft) rigid sail composed of ten panels that fold onto each other. The assembly weighed approximately 20 tonnes and constituted one of the world's tallest self-supporting composite masts. The mast was assembled in less than six months, showcasing French expertise in composites.

The demonstrator was tested for over two years before being dismantled during the night of 24–25 April 2024. It was then installed on the first sailing cargo ship of the Nantes-based shipowner Neoline, the Neoliner Origin, a 136-meter vessel under construction at the RMK Marine shipyard in Turkey.

In March 2022, the SolidSail/AeolDrive system received an Approval in Principle (AiP) from Bureau Veritas, a French classification society. This validation was issued in accordance with Bureau Veritas technical rule NR 206 relating to Wind Propulsion Systems (WPS), published in 2021. Frédéric Grizaud, Senior Vice President of Chantiers de l'Atlantique, emphasized that "the Solid Sail concept is the first of its kind, and constitutes the most advanced and innovative wind propulsion solution on the large ship market."

=== Industrialization ===
In May 2023, Chantiers de l'Atlantique announced the creation of SolidSail Mast Factory (SMAF), a dedicated company bringing together six industrial partners with equal shares: Chantiers de l'Atlantique (lead), Avel Robotics, CDK Technologies, Lorima, Multiplast, and SMM Technologies. This 4,000 m^{2} (43,000 sq ft) factory, located in the Rohu zone in Lanester (Morbihan), required an investment of approximately €20 million financed by the shareholder companies.

The factory gradually entered operation starting in spring 2024, with a machining robot delivered by Savoyard company CRENO in March, followed by a second robotic draping machine designed by Fives Machining (Capdenac-Gare, Aveyron) at the end of July 2024. The latter uses customized Atlas head technology to enable series production of 65-meter carbon masts with a diameter of approximately 3 meters.

The manufacturing process is considerably simplified compared to the initial artisanal method. Only two half-shells each the length of the mast are now produced, compared to six half-shells forming three sections previously. Draping, which was 98% manual for the first masts, is now 95% automated by robot at SMAF. At cruising speed, the factory should produce ten to twelve masts per year, with a 40% reduction in production costs compared to the prototype.

== Technical description ==
=== General concept ===
Diagram of the SolidSail wind propulsion system

SolidSail technology is based on a semi-rigid sail consisting of rectangular panels made of composite materials assembled together. Unlike traditional textile sails, this design enables very large sail areas to be achieved, up to 1,500 m^{2} (16,000 sq ft) per rigging units, while maintaining the structural strength necessary for navigation on large vessels. This option pushes the limits for deployed sail area, as conventional sails are much more fragile beyond a certain threshold.

=== Sail structure ===
SolidSail sails consist of composite panels (fiberglass, carbon fiber, and epoxy resin) framed by carbon battens forming a rigid structure. The inner membrane is made of thin fiberglass and epoxy. This panel construction allows accordion-style folding, facilitating sail storage and deployment. The panels fold onto each other without requiring external action and without flapping, which is essential for safety on very large surfaces.

This design gives SolidSail ten times the resistance of conventional sails, with an estimated lifespan of 20 to 25 years, approximately five times that of a fabric sail of equivalent dimensions.

=== AeolDrive rigging ===
The SolidSail system relies on a specific rigging called AeolDrive, also developed by Chantiers de l'Atlantique. This system includes carbon composite masts that can reach 85 to 100 meters in height depending on the version. The mast is mounted on a 360° rotating steel "gaff" allowing navigation optimization regardless of wind direction. It also has a 70° tilt capability to reduce air draft and allow passage under bridges, particularly in New York where bridges reach 54 meters.

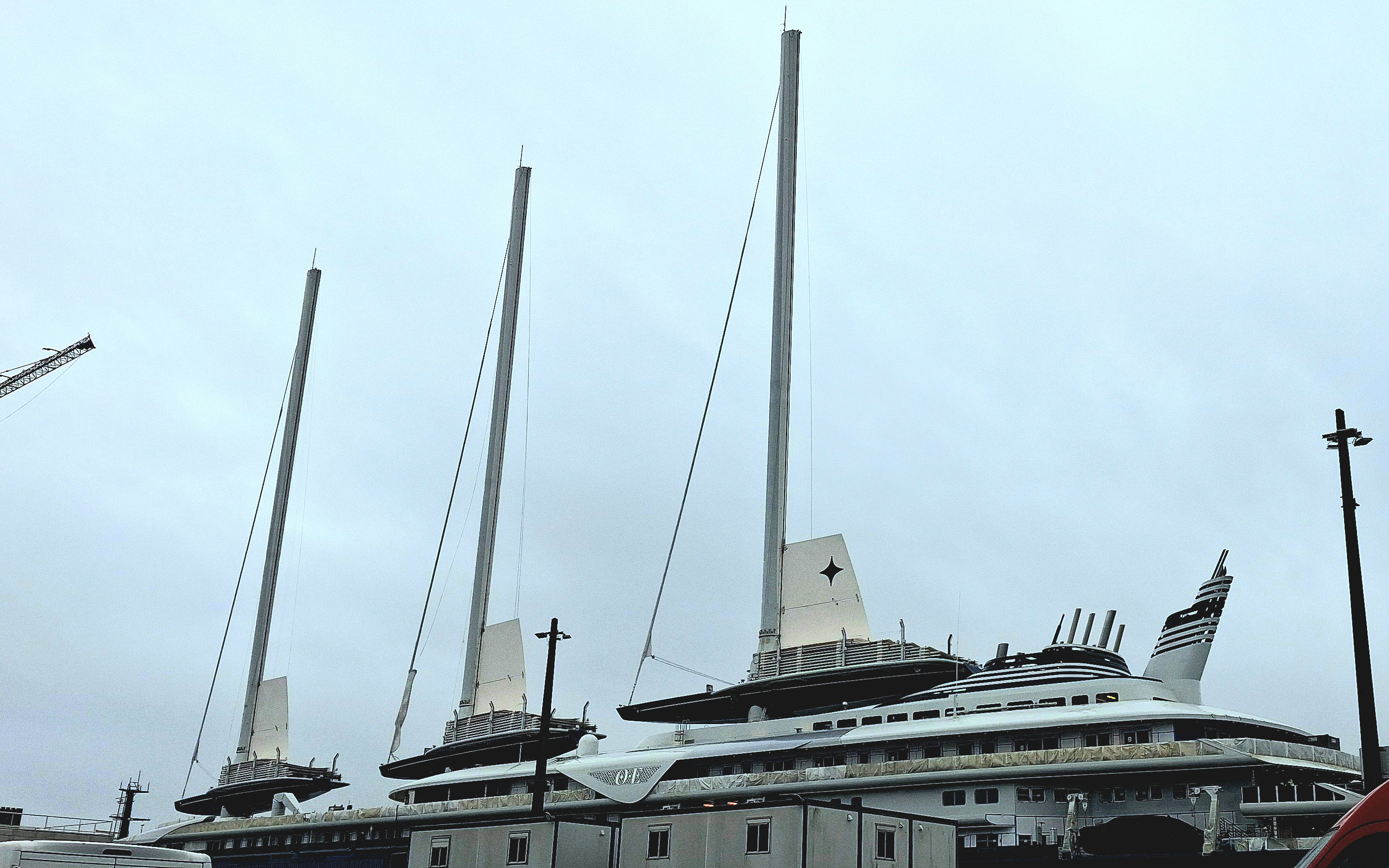
The Orient Express Corinthian with its three SolidSail masts at the Chantiers de l'Atlantique

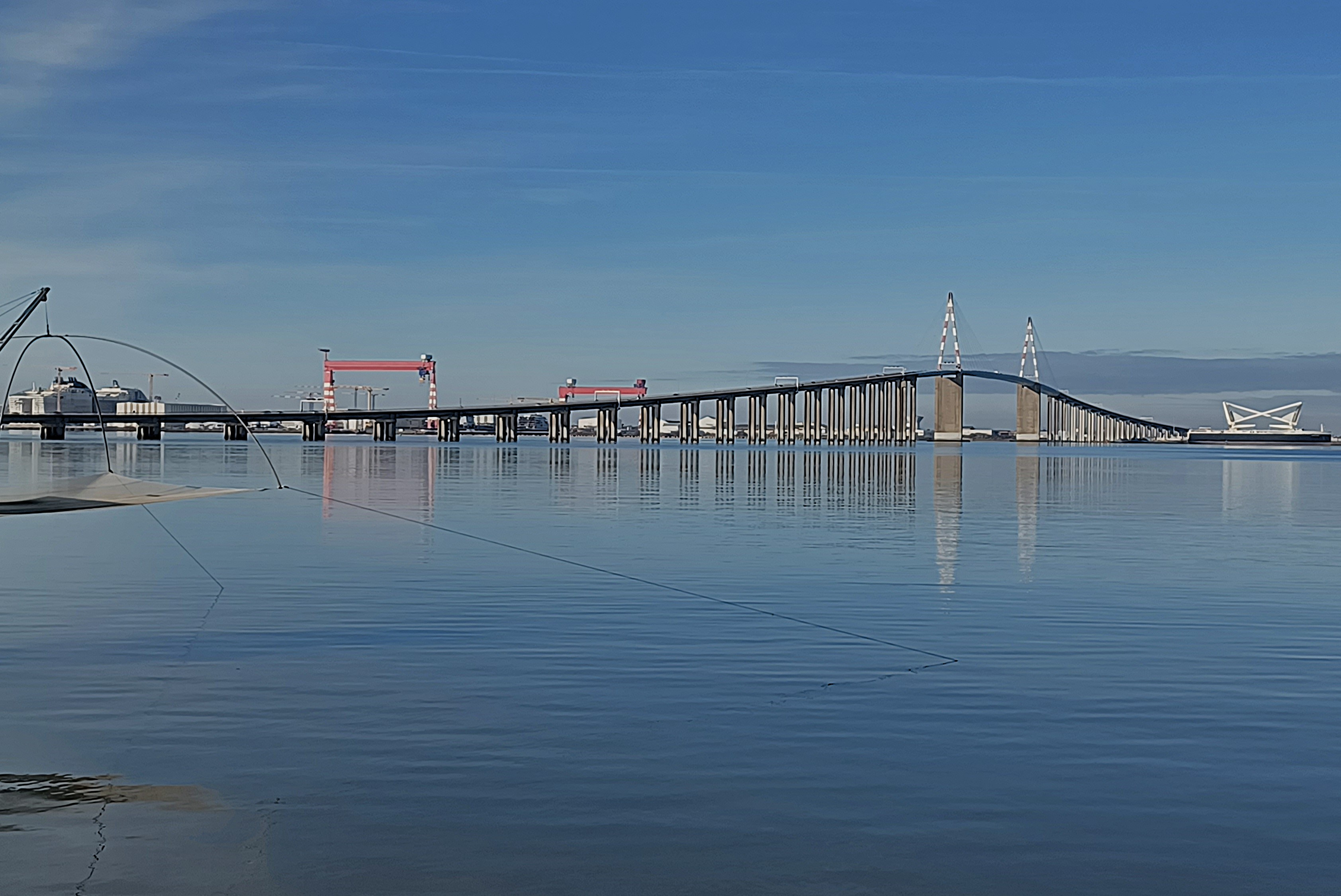
On the right of the image, the two SolidSail masts of Neoliner Origin in tilted-down position with the Saint-Nazaire Bridge

The rigging is fully automated and secured up to 40-knot winds. Sail deployment takes seven minutes, while lowering requires only five minutes. With the EolSide system, it is possible to dissociate wind direction from vessel trajectory, offering great navigation flexibility.

=== Product ranges ===
Chantiers de l'Atlantique offers several SolidSail configurations adapted to different vessel types. The SolidSail 800 version offers 800 m^{2} (8,600 sq ft) of sail area per rigging, intended for auxiliary propulsion on medium-sized vessels, enabling fuel reduction of approximately 500 tonnes per rigging per year. The SolidSail 1500 version develops 1,500 m^{2} (16,000 sq ft) of sail area per rigging with masts up to 100 meters tall, intended for primary propulsion on vessels approximately 120 meters long and enabling fuel reduction of approximately 1,000 tonnes per rigging per year.

== Performance and environmental objectives ==
According to studies conducted by Chantiers de l'Atlantique, the SolidSail system enables a reduction in CO_{2} emissions of 7,500 tonnes per year and a decrease in total fuel consumption of 25% (more than 2,500 tonnes of fuel per year). In favorable wind zones like the Caribbean, propulsion consumption reduction can reach 60% for equivalent routes. The vessel can sail under wind power up to 17 knots, a speed higher than that achieved with engine alone.

From 12 knots of apparent wind, performance equals that of a conventional sail in synthetic dacron textile. In light winds (apparent wind below 7 knots), the rigid sail performs approximately 20% less well than a textile sail, but this difference quickly disappears with increasing wind.

The three SolidSail units integrated in the propulsion systems of the Orient Express Corinthian are able to achieve standalone and exclusively wind-powered propulsion in optimal conditions, according to the tests carried out by Chantiers de l'Atlantique. Unlike ships with Wind-assisted propulsion such as the Club Med II (the third longest sailing vessel in history) which is unable to travel without using another main source of propulsion, the OE Corinthian on the other hand should be able to avoid using its LNG-powered engine at all for propulsion

== Commercial applications ==
=== Neoliner Origin ===
The first commercial vessel equipped with SolidSail technology is the Neoliner Origin, a 136-meter roll-on/roll-off (RoRo) cargo ship built by Turkish shipyard RMK Marine for French shipowner Neoline. The vessel is equipped with two 76-meter SolidSail masts each supporting a 1,050 m^{2} (11,300 sq ft) rigid sail and a soft jib, for a total sail area of approximately 3,000 m^{2} (32,000 sq ft).

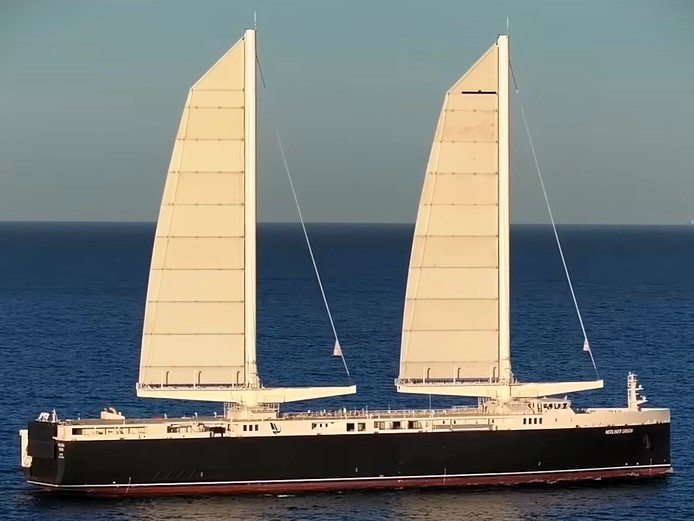
The vessel Neoliner Origin

The ship's hull was launched on 31 January 2025 at the RMK Marine shipyard in Tuzla. First trials under sail took place in the Sea of Marmara in July 2025.

Neoliner Origin made its first transatlantic crossing in October 2025, departing from the port of Montoir-de-Bretagne on 16 October bound for Baltimore via Saint-Pierre-et-Miquelon.

Through the use of sails and hydrodynamic optimization of the hull, Neoliner Origin aims for an 80% reduction in CO_{2} emissions compared to a conventional vessel of similar size. The vessel can transport up to 5,300 t (5,800 short tons) of cargo (1,200 m (3,900 ft) linear or 265 twenty-foot containers).

=== Orient Express Corinthian ===
The Orient Express Corinthian, developed for Accor by Chantiers de l'Atlantique, is the first cruise ship to use SolidSail technology. At 220 meters long making it the longest sailing vessel ever built in history, it is equipped with three 69-meter carbon masts (for a total air draft of 100 meters) each supporting a 1,500 m^{2} (16,000 sq ft) rigid sail, totaling 4,500 m^{2} (48,000 sq ft) of sail area. These tilting and rotating gaff rigs allow sailing close to the wind and achieving a maximum speed under sail of 17 knots.

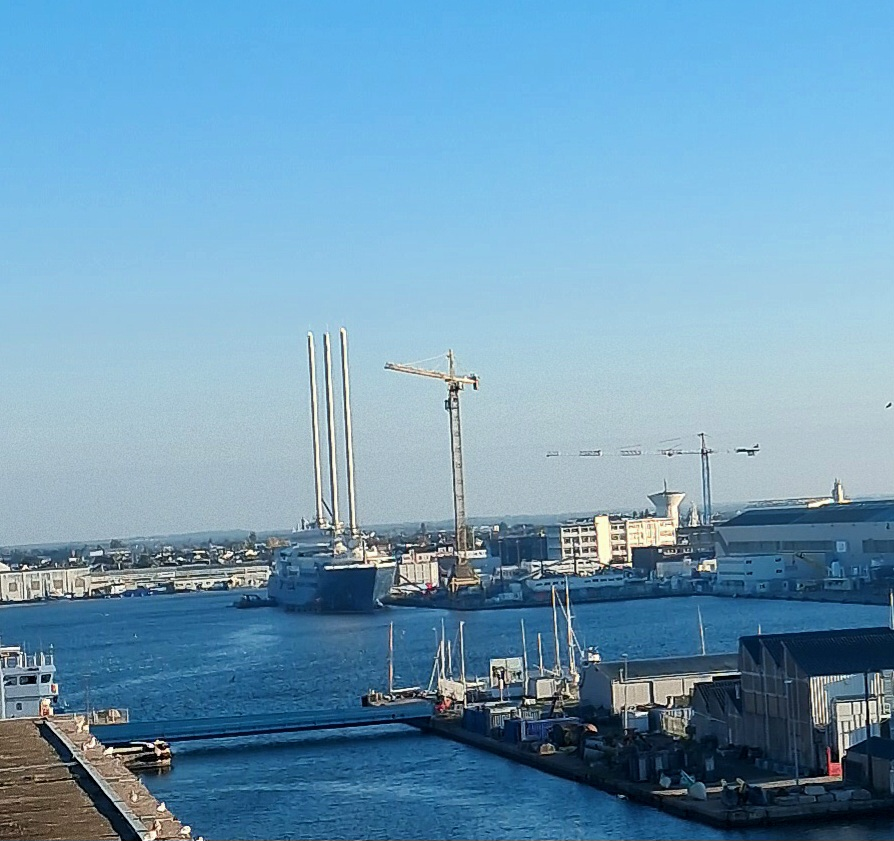
The sailing cruise ship Orient Express Corinthian docked at Saint-Nazaire port, under construction by Chantiers de l'Atlantique

The ship features 54 suites ranging from 45 to 230 m^{2} (480 to 2,480 sq ft), five restaurants with culinary direction by multi-starred chef Yannick Alléno, eight bars including a 1930s-inspired speakeasy, a 115-seat cabaret, a cinema, a recording studio, a 500 m^{2} (5,400 sq ft) Guerlain spa, and two swimming pools. The interiors are designed by French architect Maxime d'Angeac, artistic director of Orient Express, in a style inspired by Mediterranean Art Deco combining classic French refinement with contemporary technologies. The vessel's exterior is designed by Stirling Design International, an architecture studio based in Nantes.

The vessel uses hybrid propulsion combining wind energy and a liquefied natural gas (LNG) engine, with the future ambition of using green hydrogen. This combination enables approximately 40% emissions reduction. Orient Express Corinthian entered service in spring 2026, with a summer season of cruises in the Mediterranean and Adriatic seas, before crossing the Atlantic in autumn to reach the Caribbean. A sister ship, Orient Express Olympian, is due to be delivered in 2027.

=== Future applications ===
Beyond these first achievements, SolidSail technology finds applications in several maritime segments. The Silenseas project envisions a range of luxury cruise ships of 85, 120, and 190 meters equipped with this technology. Retrofit studies (modernization of existing vessels) are underway for medium-sized cargo ships. The technology also interests the large pleasure sailing yacht and superyacht sector, as well as large catamaran vessels.

== Public support and partnerships ==
=== Public financing ===
SolidSail development benefited from significant public funding. The full-scale demonstrator project, costing €18 million, received 50% public funding, notably from ADEME (Agency for the Environment and Energy Management) as part of the "Ships of the Future" program from the Future Investment Program (PIA), as well as from the Pays de la Loire and Brittany regions. Christelle Morançais, president of the Pays de la Loire Region, stated: "This project that the Pays de la Loire Region is proud to have supported is the fruit of an exemplary collaborative approach by an entire Loire Valley industry that aims to lead the way in wind propulsion for large ships."

Additionally, Solid Sail/AeolDrive benefited from ERDF (European Regional Development Fund) support mobilized by the Pôle Mer Bretagne Atlantique, as well as the European Union's Horizon 2020 research and innovation program as part of the LeanShips project. The "Ships of the Future" call for projects, launched by ADEME as part of the PIA, aims to finance research and development projects in the shipbuilding industry leading to industrializable achievements.

=== Industrial and academic partners ===
The Solid Sail/AeolDrive solution resulted from cooperation among numerous SMEs from the Pays de la Loire and Bretagne regions working with Chantiers de l'Atlantique. Breton partners include Multiplast for manufacturing composite sails and panels, Avel Robotics for automation and robotics, SMM Technologies for mast assembly, CDK Technologies for composites, Lorima for carbon mast manufacturing, G-Sea Design for naval architecture and design, as well as Blew Stoub, Ocean Data System, Pixel sur Mer, and Awentech as subcontractors.

Loire Valley partners include MECA, Wichard, Nov-BLM (steel gaff manufacturer), Lancelin, Baudin Chateauneuf, and PL Marine for deck hardware and maneuvering equipment. Italian company Flexon Composites (OneSails) supplies soft jibs in 4T FORTE technology.

On the scientific and academic level, the project was conducted in cooperation with IRT Jules Verne, the University of Nantes, ENSTA Bretagne (Institut de Recherche Dupuy de Lôme), and ICAM de l'Ouest. D-ICE Engineering provides weather routing systems to optimize routes based on wind conditions. The Wichard group, owner of Lorima, also participates through its Profurl and Facnor furler brands.

== List of SolidSail ships ==
| Vessel | | | | | | SolidSail System | | | |
| Name | Image | Client/Owner | Type | Project Status | Length | Installation site | Rig Type | Qty | Year |
|---|---|---|---|---|---|---|---|---|---|
| Le Ponant^{✶} | | Compagnie du Ponant | Three-masted schooner | Completed | 88 metres (289 ft) | Marseille | Prototype | 3 | 2018 |
| Le Ponant^{✶} | | Compagnie du Ponant | Three-masted schooner | Completed | 88 metres (289 ft) | San Giorgio del Porto, Italy | Prototype | 3 | 2019–2022 |
| Neoliner Origin | | Neoline | Sailing cargo ship | Completed | 136 metres (446 ft) | Turkey | SolidSail 1500 | 2 | 2025 |
| Orient Express Corinthian | | Accor | Sailing cruise ship | Completed | 220 metres (720 ft) | Saint-Nazaire | SolidSail 1500 | 3 | 2025 · |
| Orient Express Olympian (twin of Corinthian) | | Accor^{◈} | Sailing cruise ship | Construction phase | 220 metres (720 ft) | Saint-Nazaire | SolidSail 1500 | 3 | 2027 |
| Atlas World Adventurer | | Atlas Ocean Voyages^{φ} | Sailing cruise yacht | Order confirmed | 210 metres (690 ft) | Saint-Nazaire or China | SolidSail 800 | 3 | 2028 · |
| Grain de Sail III | | Grain de Sail | Container ship with wind-assisted propulsion | Confirmed announced as confirmed | 110 metres (360 ft) | Lorient or Saint-Nazaire | Custom model (4,000 square metres (43,000 sq ft) total) | 3 | 2027 |

_{✶ Original vessel dates back to 1990. First SolidSail rigs (prototypes) were removed in 2019}

_{φ Atlas Ocean Voyages announced the possibility of additional orders bringing the total number of sailing cruise ships to 4.}

_{◈ Accor also announced an option for two additional SolidSail vessels, totaling a fleet of 4 sailing cruise ships.}

=== SolidSail concept ships ===
| Design Name | Vessel Type | LOA | Sail Area | Max Speed (power/sail) | # of SolidSail Rigs | Designer(s) | Year | Notes |
|---|---|---|---|---|---|---|---|---|
| Eoseas | Cruise ship | 305 metres (1,001 ft) | 12,440 square metres (133,900 sq ft) | — | 5 masts | Érick Pélerin (Chantiers de l'Atlantique); Thibaut Tincelin (Stirling Design International) | 2011 | 50% fuel reduction concept |
| VLCC | VLCC tanker | 335 metres (1,099 ft) | 6,000 square metres (65,000 sq ft) | 12.5 knots (23.2 km/h; 14.4 mph) | Variable config | Chantiers de l'Atlantique | 2024 | 3,200 t annual fuel savings (newbuilding) |
| Prao | Feeder container ship | 81 metres (266 ft) | 1,600 square metres (17,000 sq ft) | 12 knots (22 km/h; 14 mph) | 2 × SolidSail 800 | Chantiers de l'Atlantique | 2024 | Small multipurpose vessel |
| RORO | RoRo vehicle carrier | 199 metres (653 ft) | 4,500 square metres (48,000 sq ft) | 13 knots (24 km/h; 15 mph) | 3 × SolidSail 1500 | Chantiers de l'Atlantique | 2024 | 3,000 t annual fuel savings |
| Container Vessel | 2400-TEU container ship | 227 metres (745 ft) | 6,000 square metres (65,000 sq ft) | 12 knots (22 km/h; 14 mph) | 4 × SolidSail 1500 | Chantiers de l'Atlantique | 2024 | Large container capacity |
| G-Global | Multi-purpose cargo vessel | Variable | Custom SolidSail | Variable | Variable config | Steve Kozloff | 2022 | 1,000+ TEU capacity; containers/vehicles/bulk; self-offloading; ship-to-shore delivery |
| Elegante | Ice-class explorer | 87 metres (285 ft) | Custom | Custom | 1 × SolidSail | Steve Kozloff | 2021 | Single-masted; 4 decks; 14 guests; PC2 ice-class |
| Caribù II | Polar-class explorer | 113 metres (371 ft) | 20,000 square feet (1,900 m^{2}) | 17/15 kn | 3 × SolidSail | Steve Kozloff | 2021 | Triple-masted; 6 decks; 14 guests; PC2 ice-class; air draft 237'→131' |
| Trident | Exploration trimaran | 100 metres (330 ft) | 20,000 square feet (1,900 m^{2}) | 17/12 kn | 2 × SolidSail | Steve Kozloff | 2022 | Double-masted; 6 decks; 26 guests; world's largest sailing trimaran |
| Glory | Ice-class explorer | 171 metres (561 ft) | 30,000 square feet (2,800 m^{2}) | 17/12 kn | 3 × SolidSail | Steve Kozloff | 2022 | Triple-masted; 5 decks; 26 guests; PC5 ice-class; 2,028 sq ft aircraft hangar |
| Epiphany | Exploration trimaran | 54 metres (177 ft) | 6,700 square feet (620 m^{2}) | 14/12 kn | Twin masts | Steve Kozloff | 2022 | Triple-hull; 3 decks; 12 guests; semi-rigid sails; air draft 44m→28m |
| 2US | Ice-class explorer | 41 metres (135 ft) | Custom | 9/10 kn | 1 × SolidSail | Steve Kozloff | 2023 | Single-masted; 5 decks; 2-person crew design; $40–50M estimate |

== Outlook ==
SolidSail Mast Factory (SMAF) estimates that this exponential wind propulsion market concerns 90-95% commercial vessels. The subsidiary also states its intention to maintain this industrial sector as much as possible in France and Southern Brittany. With the first commercial applications in service since 2025 and several projects in development, SolidSail constitutes one of the first functional solutions for decarbonizing the maritime sector. Chantiers de l'Atlantique states it is working to refine the technology and explore new applications, to make wind propulsion a viable alternative for both cruise ships and cargo transport. The creation of the SolidSail Mast Factory subsidiary enables the company to envision large-scale industrial production while significantly reducing manufacturing costs.

== See also ==
- Chantiers de l'Atlantique
- Neoliner Origin
- Orient Express Corinthian
- Marine propulsion
- Decarbonization
- Composite material
- Wind-assisted propulsion
- Sail (ship)
