= Orient Express Corinthian =

Sailing cruise ship operated by Orient Express

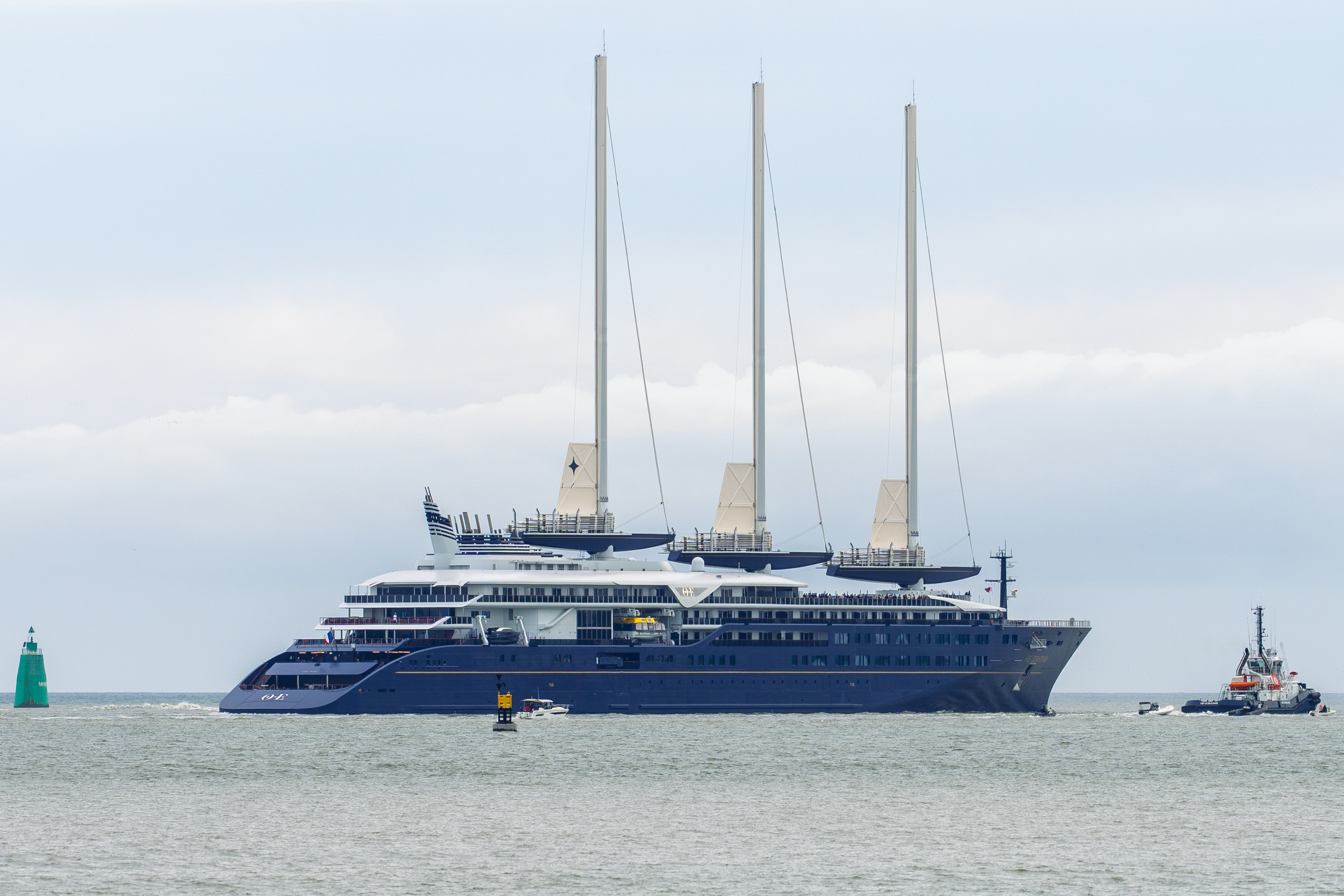
- Orient Express Corinthian off the coast of Saint Nazaire in May 2026

History

France
- Name: Orient Express Corinthian
- Owner: Orient Express (Accor in partnership with LVMH)
- Operator: Orient Express
- Port of registry: France
- Builder: Chantiers de l'Atlantique (Saint-Nazaire, France)
- Yard number: A36
- Laid down: January 2025
- Completed: April 2026
- Maiden voyage: May 2026
- Status: Sailing

General characteristics
- Class & type: Silenseas-class cruise ship
- Tonnage: 26,600 GT, 15,000 tonnes displacement
- Length: 220 m (721 ft 9 in)
- Beam: 25 m (82 ft 0 in)
- Height: 100 m (328 ft 1 in) (sail height)
- Propulsion: 3 × SolidSail rigid sails with AeolDrive system; Liquefied natural gas (LNG) auxiliary propulsion; Hydrogen-ready design
- Sail plan: 4,500 m^{2} (48,000 sq ft) total (1,500 m^{2} (16,000 sq ft) per sail)
- Capacity: 110 passengers; 54 suites

Orient Express Corinthian is a Silenseas-class cruise ship constructed at Chantiers de l'Atlantique in Saint-Nazaire, France. Orient Express Corinthian is the largest sailing ship in the world and is operated by Orient Express, a subsidiary of Accor in partnership with LVMH.

The Orient Express Corinthian is the first ship in the new Orient Express Silenseas fleet. OE Corinthian marks the return of the Orient Express brand to maritime operations, 140 years after the launch of its first trains.

== Background and design ==
=== Partnership and genesis ===
In 2022, LVMH signed a partnership agreement with Accor to develop the Orient Express brand in the luxury tourism sector. LVMH acquired a significant stake in Orient Express subsidiary, though the exact amount and threshold were not disclosed. Together, the two groups aim to deploy luxury trains, hotels, and sailing cruise ships under the Orient Express brand.

=== Ship specifications ===
With a length of 220 metres (721 ft 9 in), the Orient Express Corinthian is the world's largest sailing ship. The vessel features 54 suites accommodating 110 passengers. Each suite offers panoramic ocean views, with spaces ranging up to 70 square metres (750 sq ft). The presidential suite spans 900 square metres (9,700 sq ft). The ship has 5 eating areas, a swimming pool and spa, and a 115-seat theater.

=== Propulsion system ===
The Orient Express Corinthian is equipped with a hybrid propulsion system combining:

- Three masts equipped with SolidSail rigid sails with its AeolDrive system
- Sail height of 100 metres (330 ft)
- Total sail area of 4,500 square metres (48,000 sq ft) (1,500 square metres (16,000 sq ft) per sail)
- Auxiliary liquefied natural gas (LNG) propulsion for adverse weather conditions and maneuvering

=== SolidSail technology ===
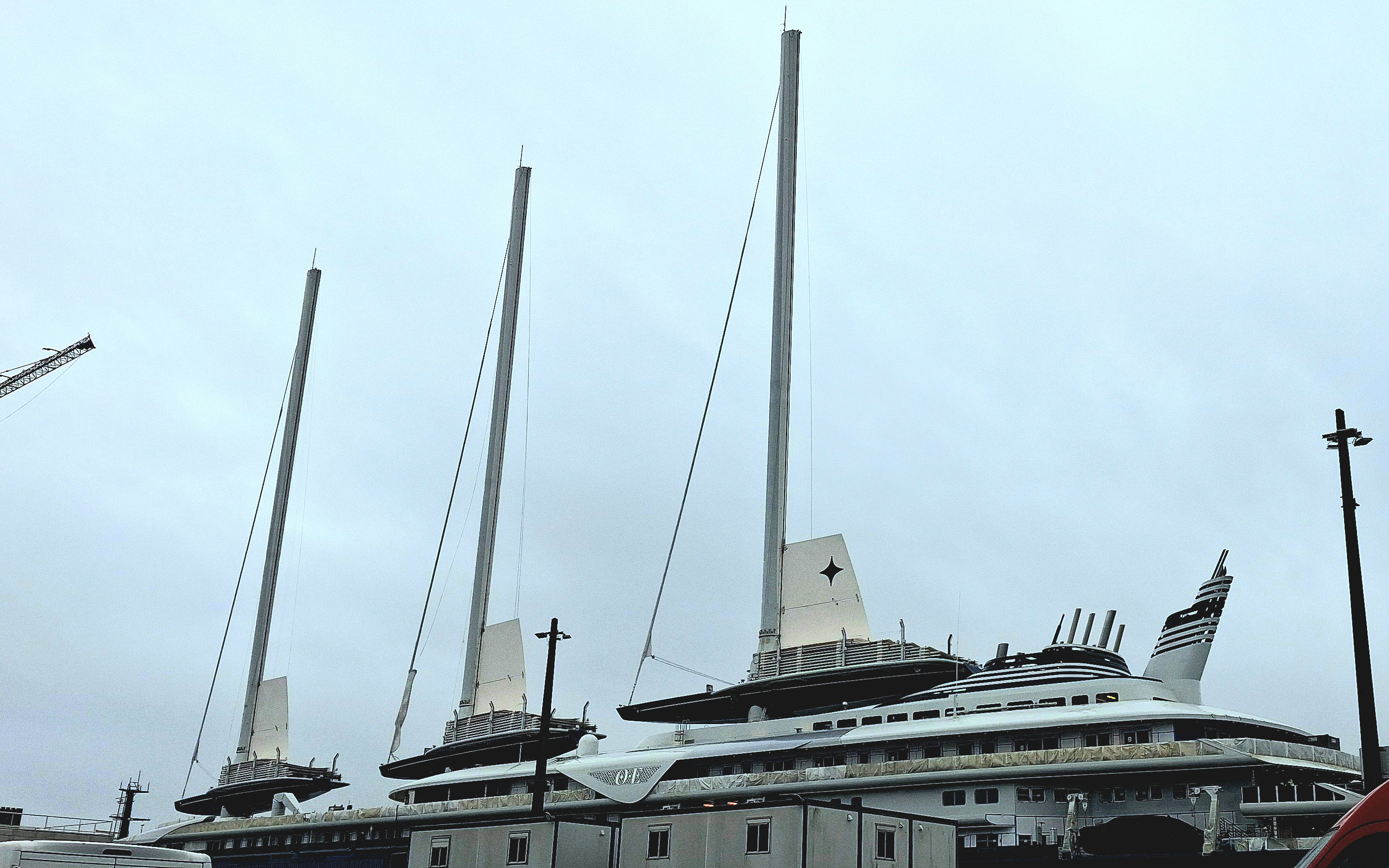
The Orient Express Corinthian with its three SolidSail masts at the Chantiers de l'Atlantique

The SolidSail technology is the result of more than a decade of research and development by Chantiers de l'Atlantique. The concept is protected by two patents filed in 2009 and 2017. This innovation is part of the Silenseas project, launched in the 2010s to develop a new range of ecological sailing cruise ships.

Unlike traditional fabric sails, these rigid sails are composed of panels made of fiberglass, carbon, and epoxy resin, framed by carbon battens. This design gives SolidSail a resistance ten times greater than conventional sails, with an estimated lifespan of 20 years — five times that of a fabric sail of equivalent dimensions.

== History ==
=== Construction and test ===
Construction of the Orient Express Corinthian began in January 2025 at Chantiers de l'Atlantique with the traditional steel-cutting ceremony. The vessel has been moored at the Penhoët quay since mid-June 2025 for the outfitting phase.

On 10 December 2025, the sailing ship left Saint-Nazaire for three days of sea trials, an operation conducted by Loire pilots. The vessel transited through the Joubert dock before heading to the open sea. The ship sailed at 12 knots in 20-knot winds, only using sails. The maiden voyage occurred in 2026.

In June 2026, the Orient Express Corinthian destroyed the wreck of a Lockheed P-38 Lightning from second world war in the Bay of La Ciotat, France with its anchor.

=== Future Silenseas-class ships ===
A second vessel in the Silenseas class is planned for delivery in April 2027, and the company is considering expanding its fleet to four ships if successful. This second vessel, expected to be named Orient Express Olympian (B36), is currently under construction with its first steel cut on 30 January 2025 and keel laying on 19 November 2025, and floated out on 17 April 2026.

== Environmental commitment ==
The Orient Express Corinthian is the second SolidSail ship after the cargoship Neoliner Origin. Its hybrid design aims to limit environmental impact by combining sail propulsion and natural gas (with emissions filtering systems). The ship is also able to accommodate future hydrogen propulsion, forming part of the cruise sector's ecological transition.

== See also ==
- List of large sailing vessels
- Star Clippers
- Wind-assisted propulsion
