= Orient Express (Accor) =

Luxury hospitality company and train service

Orient Express SAS
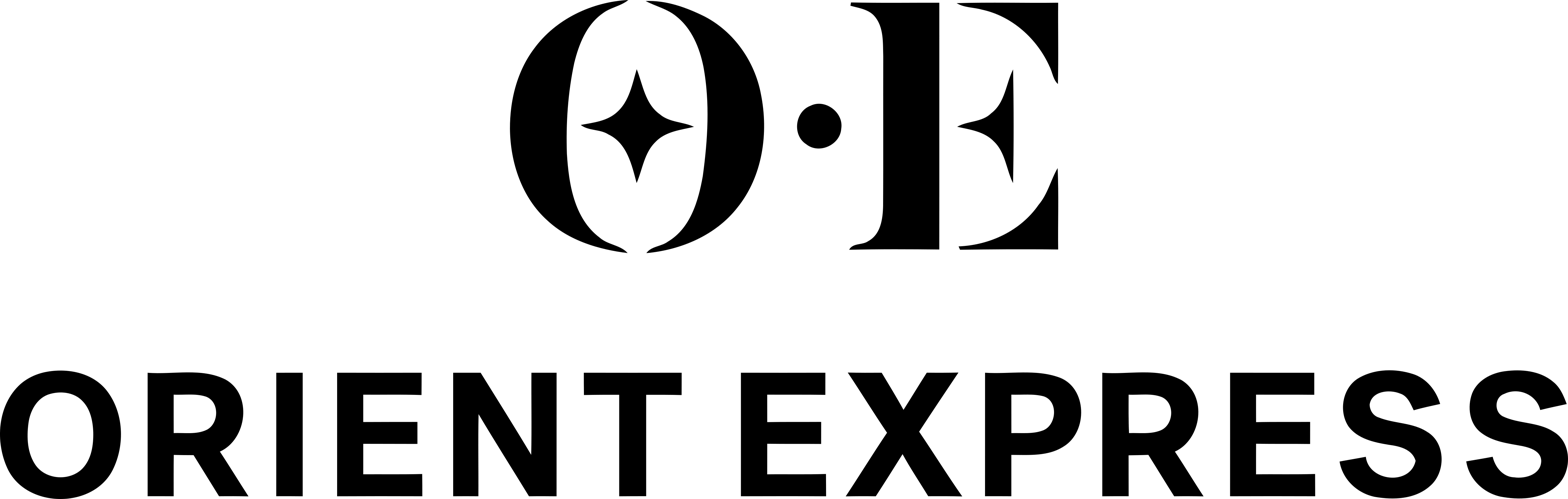

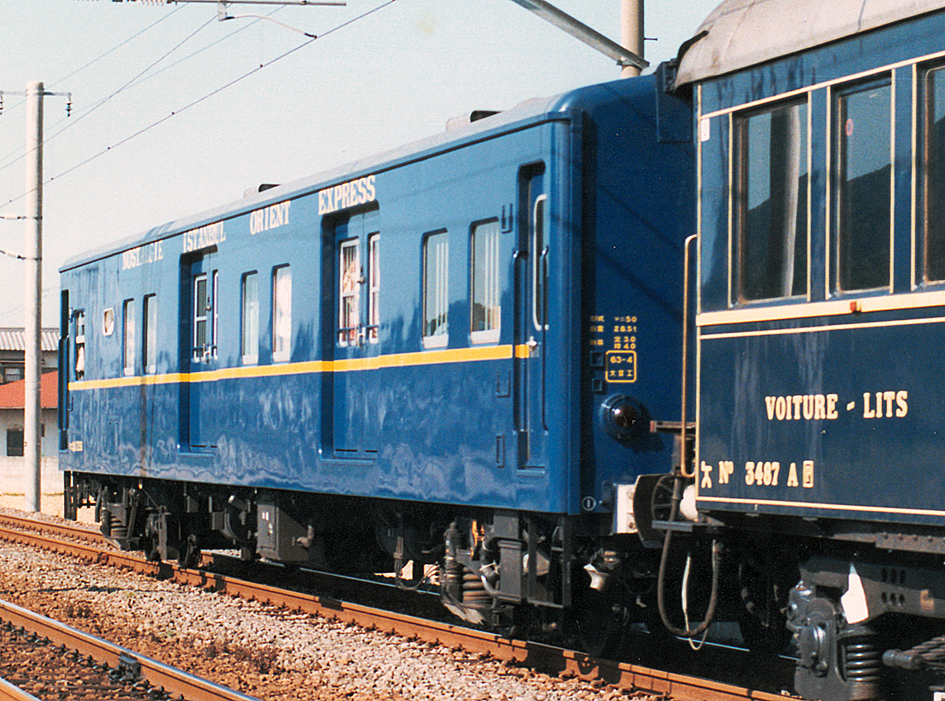
- Nostalgie Istanbul Orient Express in 1988, renovated into Accor's Orient Express.
- Industry: Hospitality
- Headquarters: Paris, France
- Key people: Gilda Perez-Alvarado (CEO)
- Services: Trains, Hotels, Cruises
- Owner: SNCF (50%); Accor (50%)
- Website: orient-express.com

The Orient Express is a private luxury train service and luxury hospitality company operated by Accor. It will carry passengers between Paris and Istanbul, as a revival of the original Orient Express, beginning in 2027. Orient Express La Dolce Vita began offering journeys around Italy in 2025.

== Trains ==
=== The Orient Express ===
In 2017, Accor purchased a 50% stake in the Orient Express brand from SNCF for the right to use the name. In 2018, Accor began renovation work on 17 CIWL carriages from the defunct Nostalgie Istanbul Orient Express, which date back to the 1920s and 1930s, to create a modern Orient Express.

Two services will be operated, the Central Europe route (France, Germany, Austria, Hungary and Czechia) and the original route (France, Germany, Austria, Hungary, Romania, Bulgaria and Turkey). The first service will begin in 2027.

=== Orient Express La Dolce Vita ===
A total of six Orient Express La Dolce Vita trains, each accommodating 62 guests, were constructed in Brindisi, Italy. The interiors are inspired by 1960s Italian design. The trains will offer overnight journeys around Italy, with itineraries including Rome, Venice and Portofino. Its inaugural journey embarked on 4 April 2025. Private journeys for up to 62 people can also be reserved, including for weddings and corporate events, with the option to choose custom decor, menus, and itineraries.

In 2026, a service from Rome to Istanbul and Istanbul to Rome was launched. The Rome to Istanbul service travels from Rome, through Venice, Budapest, Brașov, and Sinaia to Istanbul. The Istanbul to Rome service travels from Istanbul, through Plovdiv, Sofia, Timișoara, Vienna, and Venice, to Rome.

== Hotels ==
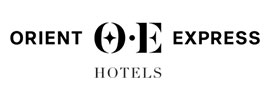
Logo of Orient Express Hotels

Accor purchased a 50 percent stake in the Orient Express brand from SNCF in 2017 to launch a chain of Orient Express hotels.

In 2019 it was announced that the first Orient Express hotel would open in Bangkok, Thailand at the King Power Mahanakhon skyscraper. It was planned to open in 2020 and would have had 154 rooms. In 2020 Orient Express and King Power mutually agreed to part ways and the Orient Express Hotel Bangkok was cancelled.

In February 2022 Arsenale S.p.A acquired The Grand Hotel de la Minerva in Rome, Italy. In July, the opening of an Orient Express hotel in the space was announced. Also in 2022 the opening of an Orient Express at the Palazzo Dona Giovannelli in Venice was announced. The hotel opened in April 2025.

Orient Express Palazzo Dona Giovannelli opened in April 2026 with the interior re-designed by Aline Asmar d'Amman.

Properties
| Name | No. of Rooms | City | Country | Opening/Opened | Ref. |
|---|---|---|---|---|---|
| Orient Express La Minerva | 93 | Rome | Italy | April 2025 | |
| Orient Express Palazzo Donà Giovannelli | 44 | Venice | Italy | April 2026 | |
| Orient Express Diriyah Gate | 80 | Riyadh | Saudi Arabia | 2027 | |
| Aqaba Gulf Hotel | Unknown | Aqaba | Jordan | Unknown | |

== Other ==
=== Cruises ===
A superyacht cruise line has been launched under the Orient Express name. The first yacht the Corinthian is the largest sailing yacht in the world and services started in 2026. A second yacht named the Olympian has also been commissioned and both will be built by Chantiers de l’Atlantique.

=== Products ===
In 2021 a collection of travel objects called "Steam Dream" launched with pop ups at La Samaritaine (a Parisian department store) and the IFC mall in Hong Kong and online. The collection includes items made by Au Départ, Smythson, Cire Trudon, Bernardaud, Duvelleroy and more.

In 2023 in a collaboration with Montblanc they launched a limited edition collection of seven Orient Express themed pens for Montblanc's High Artistry Collection.

== See also ==
- Rail transport in Europe
- Venice Simplon-Orient-Express
- Orient Express (disambiguation)
