= Großherzogin Elisabeth (ship) =

German sailing ship

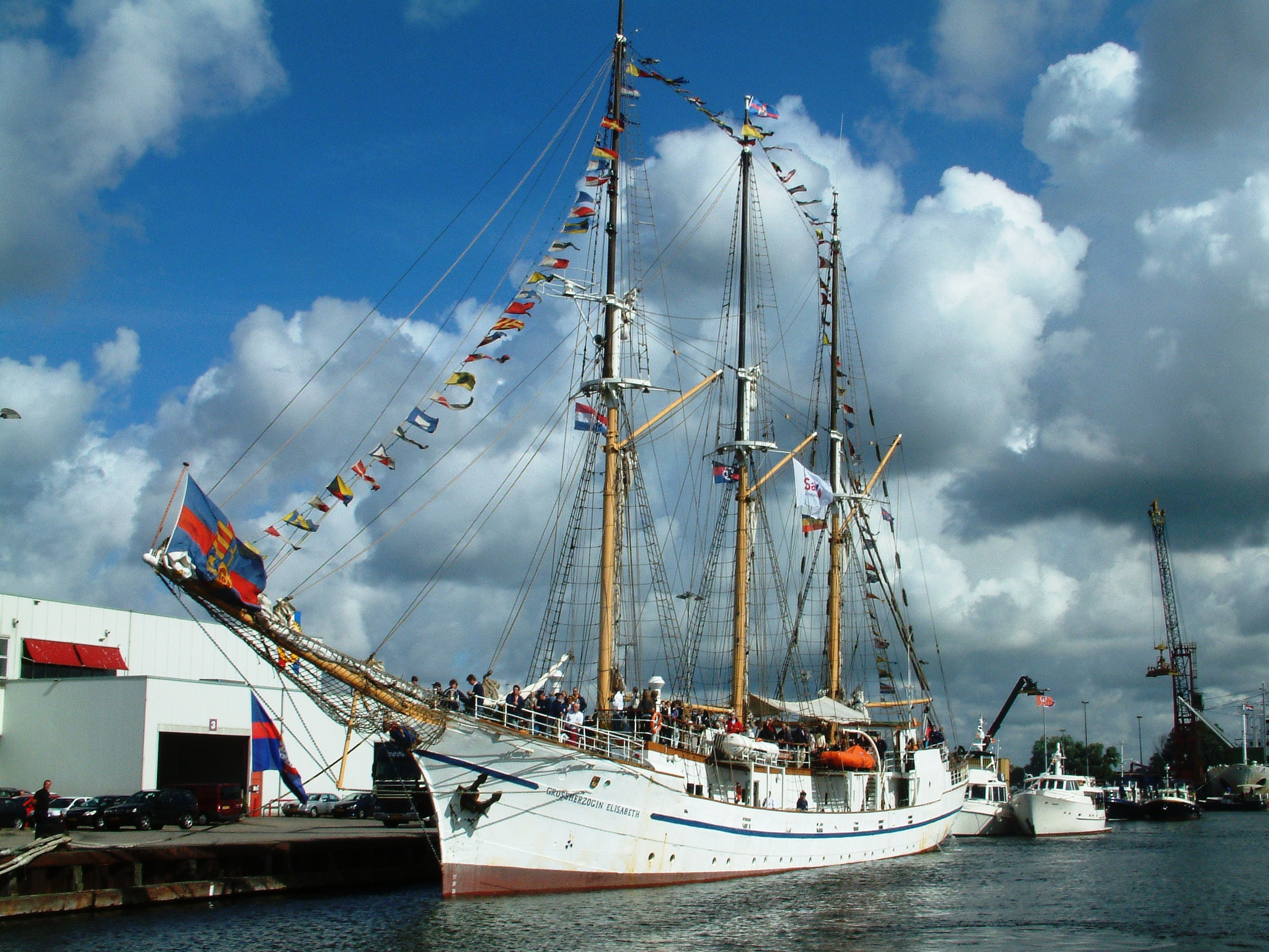
- Großherzogin Elisabeth moored in Amsterdam

History

Germany
- Name: San Antonio (1909–1973)
- Owner: Andreas Hammerstein (1909–1947)
- Builder: Built on a shipyard in Alblasserdam, Netherlands
- Launched: 19 August 1909
- Fate: Sold

Sweden
- Name: San Antonio (1965–1973)
- Owner: Werner Sandberg
- Home port: Hovenäset

Germany
- Name: Ariadne (1973–1982); Großherzogin Elisabeth (1982–present)
- Namesake: Duchess Elisabeth Alexandrine of Mecklenburg-Schwerin
- Owner: Hartmut Paschburg (1973–1982); Landkreis Wesermarsch (1982–1993); Schulschiffverein "Großherzogin Elisabeth" e. V. (1993–present)
- Acquired: 1973
- Home port: Elsfleth
- Identification: IMO number: 5309413; Call sign: DGEN; MMSI number: 211205920
- Status: Active

General characteristics
- Tonnage: 463 GRT
- Length: 63.7 m (209 ft)
- Beam: 8.23 m (27.0 ft)
- Draft: 2.7 m (8 ft 10 in)
- Installed power: 400 hp (300 kW) diesel
- Notes: Sail area: 1,010 m^{2}

Großherzogin Elisabeth is a 1909 German sailing ship built as the San Antonio, a replacement for the 1907 freighter San Antonio which had been lost in a collision at sea.

On 25 January 1914, San Antonio ran aground off the coast of Morocco. In 1929 she capsized near Copenhagen, Denmark; however, she was salvageable and was converted into a coastal trading vessel.

San Antonio was bought from Skillinge in November 1965 by Werner Sandberg. Her new home port was Hovenäset, Sweden. The skipper was Jan Sandberg. San Antonio operated the Baltic Sea and North Sea freight. She is the world's first motor sailor with a diesel engine. On 8 November 1973 she was acquired by the German shipowner Hartmut Paschburg and was a cruise ship on the Mediterranean for several years, operating with the name Ariadne.

In 1982, the ship was sold to the Kreis of Wesermarsch and the sail training club Schulschiffverein "Großherzogin Elisabeth" e. V. was founded. Since 1993, the club has been owner of the ship.

Today, Großherzogin Elisabeth is primarily used for sail training and is based in Elsfleth.

== See also ==
- List of large sailing vessels
