= List of large sailing vessels =

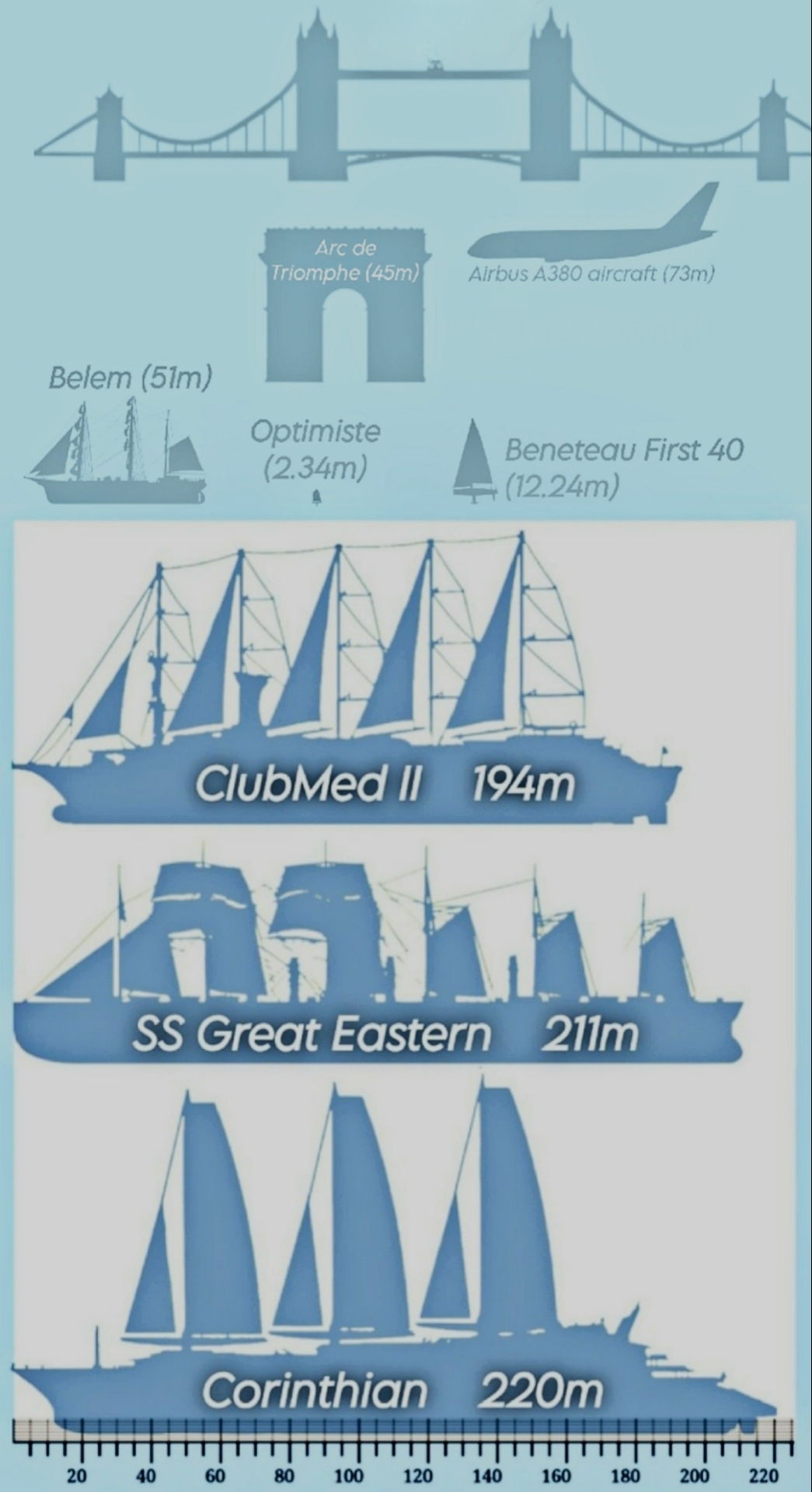
Scaled comparison diagram of lengths of the three longest sailing ships in history (as of 2026): Orient Express Corinthian, SS Great Eastern, Club Med 2 with Belem (ship), Optimist (dinghy), Beneteau 1 Ton, alongside other well known references

This list of large sailing vessels, past and present, includes sailing mega yachts, tall ships, sailing cruise ships, and large sailing military ships. The list is sorted by overall length, and covers vessels greater than about 200 feet (61 m) LOA, which includes overhangs and spars (length on deck or waterline length are other common measures of ship length).

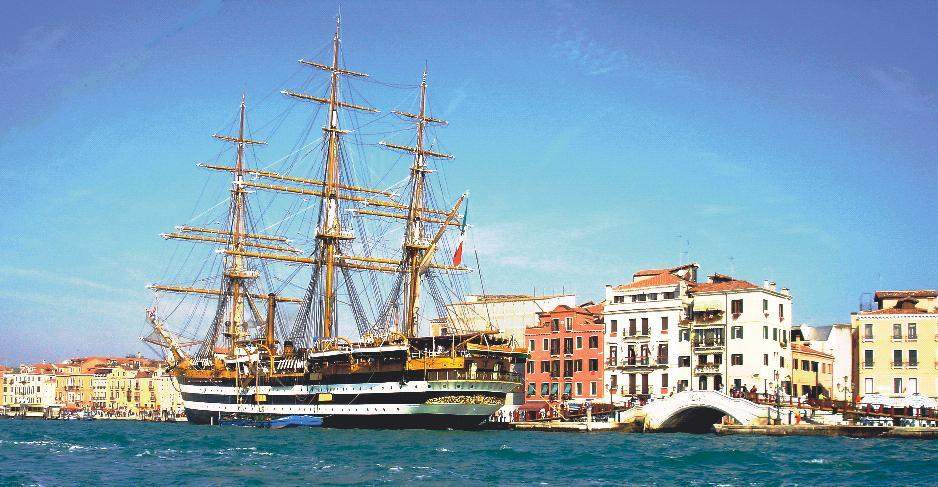
Amerigo Vespucci, Venice, 2006

General

Year: launch/delivery/active
Shipyard: makers of the yacht
LOA: overall length
LOD: length on deck
LWL: waterline length
Beam: width

Tonnage and displacement

Gross tonnage and displacement are not equivalent and vary depending on the type of ton (e.g. metric or imperial) and how they are calculated. How gross tonnage is calculated has changed somewhat over time, but has always been a measure of cargo space (i.e., it is a measure of the volume of the cargo space), and figures for displacement also can vary because of different standards for loading.

Current status

Meaning of status column:

- S Sailing today
- F Floating, permanently moored, not sailing
- D Dry dock or equivalent, permanently
- H Historic ship that no longer exists
- C In construction, under maintenance or repurposing

== List ==
Largest sailing vessels
Names	Image	Year	Status	Shipyard	LOA sparred	Beam	Masts & type	Hull material	Sail area	Gross tonnage	Displacement	Note
Orient Express Corinthian		2026	S	Chantiers de l'Atlantique	722 ft (220 m)	82 ft (25 m)	3-mast SolidSail sailing LNG ship	Steel	4,500 m^{2} (48,000 sq ft)	26,200 UMS		passenger cruise ship
Orient Express Olympian		2027	C	Chantiers de l'Atlantique	722 ft (220 m)	82 ft (25 m)	3-mast SolidSail sailing LNG ship	Steel	4,500 m^{2} (48,000 sq ft)	26,200 UMS		passenger cruise ship
SS Great Eastern		1858	H	J. Scott Russell & Co.	692 ft (211 m)	82 ft (25 m)	6-mast sailing steam ship	Iron	18,150 ft^{2} (1,686 m^{2})	18,915 GRT	32,160 long tons	passenger liner, later converted to cable laying ship
Club Med 2		1992	S	Sociéte Nouvelle des Ateliers et Chantiers du Havre (SNACH)	636.5 ft (194.0 m)	65.6 ft (20.0 m)	5-mast motorsailor	Steel	26,000 ft^{2} (2,400 m^{2})	14,983 tons	1,674 deadweight t	Cruise ship
Wind Surf; Club Med 1 La Fayette		1990	S	SNACH	617 ft (188 m)	66 ft (20 m)	5-mast motor-sailer	Steel	26,881 ft^{2} (2,497.3 m^{2})	14,745 GRT		Cruise ship
Aqua City; Merida		1984	H	Nippon Kokan (NKK)	590.2 ft (179.9 m)	23.4 ft (7.1 m)	2-mast sail-assist	Steel	352 m^{2}	18,597	30,900 DWT	sail-assisted cargo
Usuki Pioneer (de); Swift Wings; S1 Moon		1984		Usuki Tekkosho, Saiki	531.5 ft (162.0 m)	83 ft (25 m)	2-mast sail-assist	Steel	640 m^{2}	18,597 GRT		sail-assisted cargo
Golden Horizon; Flying Clipper		2018	S	Brodosplit	531.5 ft (162.2 m)	60.7 ft (18.5 m)	5-mast Barque	Steel	6,347 m^{2}	8,770 GRT		Cruise ship
Preußen		1902	H	Joh. C. Tecklenborg, Geestemünde	482 ft (147 m)	53.8 ft (16.4 m)	5-mast full rig	Steel	73,259 ft^{2} (6,806.0 m^{2})	5,081 GRT	11,150	Windjammer, cargo, Flying P-Liner
France II		1913	H	Chantiers et Ateliers de la Gironde	480.5 ft (146.5 m)	55.6 ft (16.9 m)	5-mast barque	Steel	68,350 ft^{2} (6,350 m^{2})	5,633 GRT	10,710 ts	cargo; stranded (1922) on reef northwest of Nouméa
R. C. Rickmers Neath		1906	H	Rickmers Reismühlen, Rhederei und Schiffbau, Bremerhaven	479 ft (146 m)	53.5 ft (16.3 m)	5-mast barque	Steel	6,045 m^{2}	5,548 GRT	10,500 t	cargo
Thomas W. Lawson		1902	H	Fore River Shipyard	475 ft (145 m)	50 ft (15 m)	7-mast schooner	Steel	43,000 ft^{2} (4,000 m^{2})	5,218 GRT	13,860 long tons	cargo
S/Y A		2015	S	Nobiskrug	469 ft (143 m)	82 ft (25 m)	3-mast schooner	Steel	3,747 m^{2} (40,330 ft^{2})	12,700 GRT		Private yacht
Wyoming		1909	H	Percy & Small	450 ft (140 m)	50.1 ft (15.3 m)	6-mast schooner	Wood/Iron	3,700 m^{2}	3,730 GRT	9,100 tonnes	cargo
Neoliner Origin		2025	S	RMK Marine shipyard, Istanbul	446 ft (136 m)	79 ft (24 m)	2-mast SolidSail sailing Roll-on/roll-off ship	Steel	3,000 m^{2} (32,000 sq ft)	13,278 GRT	10,826 long tons	roll-on/roll-off (Ro-Ro) sailing cargo ship
Maria Rickmers		1891	H	Russell & Co., Glasgow	443 ft (135 m)	48 ft (15 m)	5-mast barque	Steel	5,300 m^{2}	3,822 GRT; 3,344 NRT		cargo
Wind Star		1986	S	SNACH	440 ft (130 m)	52.1 ft (15.9 m)	4-mast motor-sailer	Steel	21,500 ft^{2} (2,000 m^{2})	5,350 GRT		Cruise ship
Wind Song		1987	H	SNACH	440 ft (130 m)	52.1 ft (15.9 m)	4-mast motor-sailer	Steel	21,500 ft^{2} (2,000 m^{2})	5,350 GRT		Cruise ship, scuttled
Wind Spirit		1988	S	SNACH	440 ft (130 m)	52.1 ft (15.9 m)	4-mast motor-sailer	Steel	21,500 ft^{2} (2,000 m^{2})	5,350 GRT		Cruise ship
Royal Clipper		2000	S	Gdańsk, Merwede Shipyard	439 ft (134 m)	54 ft (16 m)	5-mast full rig	Steel	56,000 ft^{2} (5,200 m^{2})	5,050 GRT		Cruise ship
Potosi		1895	H	Joh. C. Tecklenborg, Geestemünde	436 ft (133 m)	49.7 ft (15.1 m)	5-mast barque	Steel	56,510 ft^{2} (5,250 m^{2})	4,027 GRT	8,350 t (loaded)	Cargo, Flying P-Liner
France I		1890	H	D. & W. Henderson & Son, Partick Glasgow	435 ft (133 m)	48.5 ft (14.8 m)	5-mast barque		4,550 m^{2}	3,784 GRT	8,800 tons	cargo ship
København		1921	H	Ramage & Ferguson, Leith Scotland	430 ft (130 m)	49 ft (15 m)	5-mast barque	Steel	4,644.4 m^{2}	3,901 GRT		training/cargo ship
HMS Black Prince; Emerald; Impregnable III		1862	H	Robert Napier & Sons	420 ft (130 m)	58 ft (18 m)	3-mast full rig	Iron	48,400 ft^{2} (4,500 m^{2})		9,250 long tons	warship, trainer, scrapped 1923
HMS Warrior		1860	F	Thames Ironworks and Shipbuilding Company	418 ft (127 m)	58 ft (18 m)	3-mast full rig	Iron		6,039 tons burthen	9,210 long tons	warship, museum
HMS Agincourt		1867	H	Laird, Son & Co. of Birkenhead	407 ft (124 m)	59 ft 6 in (18.1 m)	5-mast			6,638 tons burthen	10,800 tons	warship
HMS Minotaur		1867	H	Thames Ironworks and Shipbuilding Company	407 ft (124 m)	59 ft 6 in (18.1 m)	5-mast		32,377 ft^{2} (3,007.9 m^{2})	6,643 tons burthen	10,690 tons	warship
HMS Northumberland		1868	H	Millwall Iron Works	407 ft (124 m)	59 ft 6 in (18.1 m)	5-mast	wood/iron	32,377 ft^{2} (3,007.9 m^{2})	6,631 tons burthen	10,784 tons	warship, rig later reduced to 3-mast
Great Republic		1853	H	Donald McKay, Boston	400 ft (120 m)	53 ft (16 m)	4-mast clipper 3-mast later	Wood	6,400 m^{2}	4,555 GRT	6,600 tons burthen	cargo, rebuilt 1862, sunk 1872
Moshulu; Kurt		1904	F	William Hamilton, River Clyde	396 ft (121 m)	46.9 ft (14.3 m)	4-mast barque	Steel	44,993 ft^{2} (4,180.0 m^{2})	3,200 GRT		museum, cargo ship
Viking		1906	F	Burmeister & Wain, Copenhagen	387 ft (118 m)	46 ft (14 m)	4-mast barque	Steel	39,700 ft^{2} (3,690 m^{2})	2,959 GRT	6,300 tons	cargo, training ship, hotel
Sedov, Kommodore Johnsen; Magdalene Vinnen II		1921	S	Friedrich Krupp Germaniawerft	385.5 ft (117.5 m)	48.9 ft (14.9 m)	4-mast barque	Steel	45,154 ft^{2} (4,194.9 m^{2})		3,476	training ship, cargo
Lawhill		1892	H	W.B. Thompson & Co., Dundee	382 ft (116 m)	45 ft (14 m)	4-mast barque	Steel	43,060 ft^{2} (4,000 m^{2})	2,942 GRT	4,600	cargo ship
HMS Achilles		1864	H	Chatham Dockyard	380 ft (120 m)	58 ft 3 in (17.8 m)	4-mast		44,000 ft^{2} (4,100 m^{2})	6,121 tons burthen	9,829 long tons	warship, rig later reduced to 3-mast
BAP Unión		2014	S	SIMA, Peru	378.94 ft (115.50 m)	44 ft (13.5 m)	4-mast barque	Steel	36,597 ft^{2} (3,400.0 m^{2})		3,200 t	training ship
Peking; HMS Pekin; Arethusa II; Peking		1911	F	Blohm + Voss, Hamburg	377.5 ft (115.1 m)	45.6 ft (13.9 m)	4-mast barque	Steel	44,132 ft^{2} (4,100.0 m^{2})	3,100 GRT		Flying P-liner, Museum, cargo ship
Passat		1911	F	Blohm + Voss, Hamburg	377 ft (115 m)	47.3 ft (14.4 m)	4-mast barque	Steel	49,514 ft^{2} (4,600.0 m^{2})	3,091 GRT	6,180 ts	Flying P-liner, hostel, cargo
Pamir		1905	H	Blohm + Voss, Hamburg	375.6 ft (114.5 m)	46.0 ft (14.0 m)	4-mast barque	Steel	40,900 ft^{2} (3,800 m^{2})	3,020 GRT	4,500	Flying P-liner, cargo ship
Kruzenshtern; Padua		1926	S	Joh. C. Tecklenborg, Geestemünde	375.5 ft (114.5 m)	46.0 ft (14.0 m)	4-mast barque	Steel	36,600 ft^{2} (3,400 m^{2})	3,545	5,725	Flying P-liner, training, tourist ship
Juan Sebastián Elcano		1927	S	Echevarrieta & Larriñaga, Cadiz	371 ft (113 m)	43.3 ft (13.2 m)	4-mast schooner	Steel	26,555 ft^{2} (2,467.0 m^{2})		3,754	training ship
Esmeralda		1953	S	Echevarrieta & Larriñaga, Cadiz	371 ft (113 m)	43.3 ft (13.2 m)	4-mast barquentine	Steel	26,555 ft^{2} (2,467.0 m^{2})		3,754	training ship
Star Flyer		1991	S	Scheepswerven van Langerbrugge	366 ft (112 m)	49.8 ft (15.2 m)	4-mast barquentine	Steel	36,000 ft^{2}	2,298 GT		cruise ship
Star Clipper		1992	S	Scheepswerven van Langerbrugge	366 ft (112 m)	45.9 ft (14.0 m)	4-mast barquentine	Steel	36,000 ft^{2}	2,298 GT		cruise ship
Dar Młodzieży		1982	S	Gdańsk Shipyard	362.9 (110.6 m)	45.9 ft (14.0 m)	3-mast frigate	Steel	32,453 ft^{2} (3,015.0 m^{2})	2,385 GRT	2,791	training ship
Kaiwo Maru II		1989	S	Sumitomo Heavy Industries (SHI)	361 ft (110 m)	45.2 ft (13.8 m)	4-mast barque	Steel	29,708 ft^{2} (2,760.0 m^{2})	2,556		training ship
Nippon Maru II		1984	S	SHI	361 ft (110 m)	35.1 ft (10.7 m)	4-mast barque	Steel	29,708 ft^{2} (2,760.0 m^{2})	2,570		training ship
Sea Cloud; Angelita; Hussar V		1931	S	Krupp	360 ft (109.7) m	50 ft (15 m)	4-mast full rig ship	Steel	32,000 ft^{2} (3,000 m^{2})	2,532 GRT		Cruise ship, yacht
Pallada		1989	S	Gdańsk Shipyard	356.3 ft (108.6 m)	45.75 ft (13.94 m)	3-mast full rig	Steel	29,827 ft^{2} (2,771.0 m^{2})	2,264 GRT	2,987	Training ship
Nadezhda		1992	S	Gdańsk Shipyard	358.9 ft (109.4 m)	45.9 ft (14 m)	3-mast full rig	Steel	20,794.5 sq ft (2,768 m^{2)}		2,986 long tons	training
Mir		1987	S	Lenin Shipyard	358 ft (109 m)	45.6 ft (13.9 m)	3-mast full rig	Steel	29,826.8 sq ft (2,771 m^{2)}		2,257	trainer
Khersones		1989	S	Lenin Shipyard	356 ft (109 m)	46 ft (14 m)	3-mast full rig	Steel	29,800 ft^{2} (2,770 m^{2})			training/charter
Black Pearl (Y712)		2016	S	Alblasserdam shipyard	350 ft (110 m)	49 ft (15 m)	3-mast DynaRig	Steel	2,877 m^{2} (30,970 ft^{2})	2,986		yacht
Sea Cloud II		2001	S	Astilleros Gondán, Castropol	348 ft (106 m)	52 ft (16 m)	3-mast barque	Steel	30,000 ft^{2} (2,800 m^{2})	3,849 GRT		Cruise ship
HMS Alexandra		1877	H	Chatham Dockyard	344 ft (105 m)	63 ft 10 in (19.5 m)	3-mast				9,492 long tons	warship
HMS Inflexible		1881	H	Portsmouth Dockyard	344 ft (105 m)	75 ft (23 m)	2-mast		18,500 ft^{2} (1,720 m^{2})		11,880 tons (full load)	warship, underrigged, rig later discarded
ARA Libertad		1956	S	Rio Santiago	340.4 ft (103.8 m)	46.9 ft (14.3 m)	3-mast ship	Steel	28,546 ft^{2} (2,652.0 m^{2})		3,720	training ship
Amerigo Vespucci		1930	S	Castellammare di Stabia	331 ft (101 m)	51 ft (16 m)	3-mast full rig	Steel	30,400 ft^{2} (2,820 m^{2})	2,686	4,146 tons (full load)	training ship
HMS Monarch		1869	H	Chatham Dockyard	330 ft (100 m)	57 ft 6 in (17.5 m)	3-mast full rig ship		27,700 ft^{2} (2,570 m^{2})	5,102 tons burthen	8,322 long tons	warship/ironclad
Redoutable		1878	H		330 ft (100 m)	64 ft (20 m)	3-mast steamer	steel/iron			9224 tonnes	warship, rig later discarded?
Parma		1902	H	Port Glasgow	327.6 ft (99.9 m)	46.4 ft (14.1 m)	4-mast barque	steel/iron			5,300 tonnes	cargo ship
HMS Hercules		1868	H	Chatham Dockyard	325 ft (99 m)	59 ft (18 m)	3-mast full-rig ship		49,400 ft^{2} (4,590 m^{2})	5,234 tons burthen	8,830 long tons (full load)	warship
HMS Sultan		1871	H	Chatham Dockyard	325 ft (99 m)	59 ft (18 m)	3-mast full rig		49,400 ft^{2} (4,590 m^{2})	5,234 tons burthen	9,290 long tons	warship
Colbert		1877	H	Brest shipyard	325 ft (99 m)	57 ft (17 m)	3-mast	wood/iron			8,600 tonnes	warship
Statsraad Lehmkuhl; Großherzog Friedrich August		1914	S	Joh. C. Tecklenborg, Geestemünde	321.5 ft (98.0 m)	41.4 ft (12.6 m)	3-mast barque	Steel	21,808 ft^{2} (2,026.0 m^{2})	1,516 t		training ship
SS Great Britain		1843	D	Bristol	322 ft (98 m)	50 ft 6 in (15.39 m)	5-mast steamer 3-mast	iron			3,675 tons load draught	Museum ship Passenger steamship
HMS Captain		1870	H	Laird Brothers, Birkenhead	320 ft (98 m)	53 ft 3 in (16.2 m)	3-mast steamer		50,000 ft^{2} (4,600 m^{2})	4,272 tons burthen	7,767 tons	warship
Rickmer Rickmers; NRP Santo André; NRP Sagres; Flores; Max		1896	F	Rickmers shipyard, Bremerhaven	318.2 ft (97.0 m)	40 ft (12 m)	3-mast barque	Steel	3,500 m^{2}	1,980 BRT; 3,067 TDW		Museum ship
Richelieu		1876	H	Toulon shipyard	316 ft (96 m)	57 ft (17 m)	3-mast	Wood iron clad	22,055 ft^{2} (2,049.0 m^{2})		9,000 tonnes	warship
Pommern; Mneme		1903	F	J Reid & Co	312 ft (95 m)	43 ft 13 m	4-mast barque	Steel	36,800 ft^{2} (3,420 m^{2})	2,376 GRT		Windjammer, museum
John Ena		1892	H	R. Duncan & Co., Port Glasgow	312 ft (95 m)	48 ft (15 m)	4-mast barque	Steel		2,842 GRT		Cargo
Dar Pomorza; Prinzeß Eitel Friedrich		1909	F	Blohm + Voss, Hamburg	305.1 ft (93.0 m)	41.3 ft (12.6 m)	3-mast frigate	Steel	2,100 m^{2}	1,561 tonnes		Museum, training ship
Eos		2006	S	Lürssen	304.9 ft (92.9 m)	44.3 ft (13.5 m)	3-mast bermuda rigged schooner	Aluminium	3,600 m^{2}	1,500		Yacht
Baron of Renfrew		1825	H	Charles Wood	304 ft (93 m)	61 ft (19 m)	4-mast barque	Wood		5,294 GRT		Disposable
USS Constitution		1797	FS	Edmund Hartt, Boston	304 ft (93 m)	43 ft (13 m)	3-mast heavy frigate	Wood	42,710 ft^{2} (3,968 m^{2})		2,200 tons	Warship ('Old Ironsides')
Balclutha; Pacific Queen; Star of Alaska; Balclutha		1886	F	Charles Connell and Company	301 ft (92 m)	38.6 ft (11.8 m)	3-mast full rig ship	Steel		1689 GRT		Museum, Cargo ship
HMS Bellerophon		1866	H	Chatham Dockyard	300 ft (91 m)	56 ft 1 in (17.1 m)	3-mast steamer	wood/iron steel	23,800 ft^{2} (2,210 m^{2})	4,720 tons burthen	7,551 tons	warship
ARM Cuauhtémoc		1982	S	Astilleros Celaya S.A., Bilbao, Spain	296.9 ft (90.5 m)	39 ft 4 in (12 m)	3-mast barque	Steel	25,489 ft^{2} (2,368.0 m^{2})		1,800 tons	training ship
Athena		2004	S	Royal Huisman	295.3 ft (90.0 m)	40.0 ft (12.2 m)	3-mast gaff rigged schooner	Aluminium	28,632 ft^{2} (2,660.0 m^{2})	1,177	1,126	Yacht
USCGC Eagle; Horst Wessel		1936	S	Blohm + Voss, Hamburg	295 ft (90 m)	39 ft 1 in (11.9 m)	3-mast barque	Steel	21,344 ft^{2} (1,982.9 m^{2})		1,784 tons (full load)	training ship
NRP Sagres; Guanabara; Albert Leo Schlageter		1937	S	Blohm + Voss, Hamburg	295 ft (90 m)	40 ft (12 m)	3-mast barque	Steel	21,000 ft^{2} (2,000 m^{2})		1,755 tons (full load)	training ship
Legacy ex-France II		1959	S	Forges et al. Meditterranee, Le Havre	294 ft (90 m)	40 ft (12 m)	4-mast Barquentine	Steel		1,740 GRT		Initially a Research ship, later convrted for luxury Cruising
Gorch Fock		1958	S	Blohm + Voss, Hamburg	293.3 ft (89.4 m)	39 ft (12 m)	3-mast barque	Steel	21,926 ft^{2} (2,037.0 m^{2})	3,181 GRT	1,760 (full load)	training ship
Archibald Russell		1905	H	Scotts Shipbuilding and Engineering Co., Greenock	291.3 ft (88.8 m)	42.8 ft (13.0 m)	4-mast barque	Steel		2,354 GRT		cargo
Le Ponant		1991	S	Societe Francaise de Construction Navale	290 ft (88 m)	39.4 ft (12.0 m)	3-mast schooner	Steel	16,140 ft^{2} (1,499 m^{2})	1,443 UMS	850	cruise ship
The Maltese Falcon		2006	S	Perini Navi	289.1 ft (88.1 m)	40.9 ft (12.5 m)	3-mast dynarigg clipper	Steel	25,791 ft^{2} (2,396.1 m^{2})	1,110	1,240	Yacht
HMS Temeraire		1877	H	Chatham Dockyard	285 ft (87 m)	62 ft (19 m)	2-mast brig		25,000 ft^{2} (2,300 m^{2})		8,540 long tons	warship
Dom Fernando ll e Glória		1843	D	Shipyards of the Royal Navy Arsenal, Daman	284 ft (87 m)	42 ft (13 m)	3-mast Frigate	Wood	22,190 sq ft (2.052,2 m^{2})		1,849,16 tons	Museum, warship
Glenlee; Islamount; Clarastella; Galatea		1896	F	Anderson Rodger & Company, Port Glasgow	282 ft (86 m)	37.5 ft (11.4 m)	3-mast Barque	Steel		1,613 GRT	C. 2,990 tons	museum, cargo ship
HMS Lord Clyde		1866	H	Pembroke dockyard	280 ft (85 m)	59 ft (18 m)		Wood	31,000 ft^{2} (2,900 m^{2})	4,067 tons burthen	7,750 tons	warship, ironclad
HMS Lord Warden		1867	H	Chatham Dockyard	280 ft (85 m)	59 ft (18 m)	3-mast	Wood		4,080 tons burthen	7,842 long tons	warship, ironclad
Cutty Sark		1869	D	William Denny and Brothers/Scott & Linton, Dumbarton	280 ft (85 m)	36 ft (11 m)	3-mast Clipper	Wood/Iron	32,291 ft^{2} (2,999.9 m^{2})	963 GRT	2,700 tons (2,747 t) (full load)	Museum, tea clipper
Falls of Clyde		1878	H	Russell and Company, Port Glasgow	280 ft (85 m)	40 ft (12 m)	4-mast full rig	Iron		1,807 GRT		Museum, Cargo ship, scuttled in 2025 off Oahu
Wavertree		1885	F	R.W. Leyland & Company, Southampton	279 ft (85 m)	40.2 ft (12.3 m)	3-mast full rig	Iron	31,495 sq ft	2,170 GRT		Museum, Cargo ship
Star of India; Euterpe		1863	S	Gibson, McDonald & Arnold, Ramsey, Isle of Man	278 ft (85 m)	35.2 ft (10.7 m)	3-mast barque	Iron		1,318 GRT		Museum, cargo ship
HMS Trincomalee		1817	D	Bombay Dockyard, India	276 ft (84 m)	39.9 ft (12.2 m)	3-mast heavy frigate	Wood			1,065.63 bm	Museum Ship
Simón Bolívar		1979	S	Astilleros Celaya	270 ft (82 m)	35 ft 1 in (10.69 m)	3-mast barque	Steel	17,800 ft^{2} (1,650 m^{2})		1,260 tons	training ship
Mircea		1938	S	Blohm + Voss, Hamburg	269 ft (82.1 m)	39.4 ft (12.0 m)	3-mast barque	Steel	18,815 ft^{2} (1,748.0 m^{2})	1,312 GRT	1,760 ts	training ship
Anemos		2024	S	Piriou	266 ft (81 m)	49 ft (15 m)	2-mast schooner	Steel	22,000 ft^{2} (2,000 m^{2})	1,100 tons		TOWT cargo ship, sister-ship to Artemis.
Artemis		2024	S	Piriou	266 ft (81 m)	49 ft (15 m)	2-mast schooner	Steel	22,000 ft^{2} (2,000 m^{2})	1,100 tons		Cargo ship, sister-ship to Anemos.
Oregon Pine; Dorothy H. Sterling		1920	H	Portland, Oregon	267 ft (81 m)	49 ft 6 in (15.1 m)	6-mast schooner					Lumber schooner shipwreck
Sovereign of the Seas		1852	H	Shipyard of Donald McKay, East Boston	258 ft 2 in	44 ft 7 in	3-mast Clipper	Wood			2,421 tons	Tea clipper
Mercator		1932	F	Ramage and Ferguson, Leith	258 ft (79 m)	35 ft (11 m)	3-mast barquentine	Steel		770		trainer, museum
Skomvær		1890	H	Laxevaags Maskin- og Jernskibsbyggeri	257.4 ft (78.5 m)	38.2 ft (11.6 m)	3-mast Barque	Steel		1,775 GRT; 1,686 NRT; 2,650 DWT		Cargo ship, scrapped 1924
BAE Guayas		1976	S	Astilleros Celaya S.A., Bilbao, Spain	257 ft 3 in (78.40 m)	33 ft 4 in (10.16 m)	3-mast barque	Steel	15,200 ft^{2} (1,410 m^{2} )	934 DWT	1,300 tons	training ship
Danmark		1933	S	Nakskov	253 ft (77 m)	33.1 ft (10.1 m)	3-mast ship	Steel	17,567 ft^{2} (1,632.0 m^{2})	737		training ship
Stad Amsterdam		2000	S	Damen Shipyard	249.3 ft (76.0 m)	34.5 ft (10.5 m)	3-mast clipper	Steel	23,681 ft^{2} (2,200.0 m^{2})	723 GRT	1,038 tonnes	
Cisne Branco		1999	S	Damen Shipyard	249.3 ft (76.0 m)	34.5 ft (10.5 m)	3-mast clipper	Steel	23,681 ft^{2} (2,200.0 m^{2})	723 GRT	1,038 tonnes	
M5; Mirabella V		2004	S	Vosper Thornycroft	246.8 ft (75.2 m)	48.6 ft (14.8 m)	1-mast, sloop	GRP	36,490 ft^{2} (3,390 m^{2})	1,004	765	Yacht
Phocea; Club Mediterrannee; La Vie Claire		1976	S	DCAN, Toulon	246.5 ft (75.1 m)	31.4 ft (9.6 m)	4-mast schooner	Steel	2,775 m^{2}	530	554	Yacht; Single-handed Racer
Christian Radich		1937	S	Framnæs, Norway	240 ft (73 m)	32 ft (9.8 m)	3-mast full-rigged ship	Steel	14,600 ft^{2} (1,360 m^{2})		1,050 tonnes	training, charter
Shin Aitoku Maru (de)		1980		Nippon Kokan (NKK)	236 ft (72 m)	34 ft (10 m)	2-mast motor-sailor	Steel	200 m^{2}	600 ton	1,475 t 1,600 DWT	Experimental sail
Jylland		1860	D	Naval dock Yard, Copenhagen	233 ft (71 m)	44 ft (13 m)	3-mast steam frigate	Wood		2,456 tons		Museum, warship
James Craig; Clan Macleod		1874	S	Bartram, Haswell & Co, Sunderland, England	229.6 ft (70.0 m)	31.3 ft (9.5 m)	3-mast Barque	Iron	? m^{2}	671 GRT		Tall Ship, Cargo
HMS Victory		1765	D	Portsmouth Historic Dockyard	227 ft 6 in (69.3 m)	51 ft 10 in (15.8 m)	3-mast ship of the line	Wood	58,556 ft^{2} (5,440.0 m^{2})	2,142 tons (2,176.4 t)	3,500 tons (3,556 t)	Museum, warship
Atlantic		2010	S	Van der Graaf	227.2 ft (69.3 m)	29 ft (8.8 m)	3-mast schooner	steel	18,500 ft^{2} (1,720 m^{2})			New Atlantic
Atlantic		1903	H	Townsend and Downey	227 ft (69 m)	29 ft (8.8 m)	3-mast schooner	steel	18,500 ft^{2} (1,720 m^{2})		303 tonnes	yacht, warship, won Kaiser's Cup
Palinuro; Commandant Louis Richard		1934	S	Chantiers Dubigeon, Nantes	226.4 ft (69.0 m)	30.2 ft (9.2 m)	3-mast schooner	Steel	2,634 m^{2}	835 t	1,341 tonnes	training ship
Vasa		1627	D	Navy Yard, Stockholm	226 ft (69 m)	38 ft (12 m)	3-mast warship	Wood	13,720 ft^{2} (1,275 m^{2})		1,210 tonnes	Museum, warship
Tippoo Saib		1840?	H				3-mast Barque	Iron		1,022		Passenger and cargo ship, wrecked at sea
Lady Elizabeth		1879	H	Robert Thompson & Sons	223 ft (68 m)	35 ft (11 m)	3-mast Barque	Iron		1,208		Cargo Ship, wreck
UAM Creoula		1937	S	Estaleiros CUF, Lisbon	221.1 ft (67.4 m)	32.48 ft (9.90 m)	4-mast lugger	Steel	14,681 ft^{2} (1,363.9 m^{2})		1,300 tons	Sail training
Santa Maria Manuela		1937	S	Estaleiros CUF, Lisbon	221.1 ft (67.4 m)	32.48 ft (9.90 m)	4-mast schooner	Steel	12,163 ft^{2} (1,130.0 m^{2})		1,300 tons	Cruise ship
Vertigo		2010	S	Alloy Yachts, Auckland	220 ft (67 m)	41.1 ft (12.5 m)	2-mast ketch	Aluminium	5,330 m^{2}	837 GRT		Yacht
C.A. Thayer		1895	F	Hans D. Bendixsen	219 ft (67 m)	36 ft (11 m)	3-mast schooner	Wood		453 GRT		Museum ship, Fishing, Cargo
Hetairos; Panamax		2011	S	Baltic Yachts, Finland	218.8 ft (66.7 m)	34.6 ft (10.5 m)	2-mast ketch	GRP				Yacht; Dykstra & Partners; Reichel Pugh
Aglaia		2011	S	Vitters Shipyard	216.5 ft (66.0 m)	33.8 ft (10.3 m)	1-mast, sloop		2,370 m^{2}	494		Yacht, Dubois/Redman Whiteley Dixon
Creole; Vira		1927	S	Camper & Nicholsons, refitting by Cantiere Navale Ferrari-Signani	214.2 ft (65.3 m)	30.97 ft (9.4 m)	3-mast schooner	Wood	1,640 m^{2}	381	697	Yacht; Mine Sweeper
Alexander von Humboldt II		2011	S	BVT	213.4 ft (65.0 m)	33 ft (10 m)	3-mast barque	Steel	1,360 m^{2}	763 GRT	992 tonnes	training ship
Tenacious		2000	S	Jubilee Yard, Southampton	213 ft (65 m)	35 ft (11 m)	3-mast barque	Wood	13,100 ft^{2} (1,220 m^{2})		586 tons burthen	sail training
Adix		1984	S	Astilleros de Mallorca S.A.	212.76 ft (64.85 m)	29.13 ft (8.88 m)	3-mast schooner	Steel	1,720 m^{2}	291	370	Yacht
Pilar Rossi		1989; 2005	S	Alucraft	211.12 ft (64.35 m)	46.2 ft (14.1 m)	2-mast trimaran	Steel				Yacht, lengthened 2005
Sørlandet		1927	S	Høivolds Mek. Verksted	210.47 ft (64.15 m)	22.54 ft (6.87 m)	3-mast full rig	Steel	1,166 m^{2}	499 GT	891 tons	School Ship
Felicita West		2003	S	Perini Navi	209.97 ft (64.00 m)	41.7 ft (12.7 m)	2-mast	Aluminium	2,299 m^{2}	650	650	Yacht
Running on Waves		2011	S	Gdansk	209.97 ft (64.00 m)	29.53 ft (9.00 m)	3-mast Barkentine	Steel	1,300 m^{2}	634 GT	700 t	Yacht, Choren Design
Capitán Miranda		1930	S	Sociedad Española de Construcción Naval, Cádiz	210 ft (64 m)	26 ft (7.9 m)	3-mast schooner	Steel	853.35 m^{2}	852 GT		School Ship
Großherzogin Elisabeth; Ariadne; San Antonio		1909	S	Scheepswerf Smit Jan Alblasserdam	209 ft (64 m)	27.0 ft (8.2 m)	3-mast Schooner	Steel	1,010 m^{2}	463 GRT; 540 DWT		Club owned Cruise ship Coaster; Freighter
Alexander von Humboldt; Reserve Sonderburg		1906	F	AG Weser, Bremen	205.2 ft (62.5 m)	26.3 ft (8.0 m)	3-mast Barque	Steel	11,140 ft^{2} (1,035 m^{2})	829 ts	396	botel, moored in Bremen charter yacht training lightship
Rainbow Warrior III		2011	S	Fr. Fassmer GmbH & Co. KG, Bremen, Germany	201.3 ft (61.4 m)	37.1 ft (11.3 m)	2-mast A-frame schooner	Steel	13,500 ft^{2} (1,250 m^{2})	855 t	860 t	environmental campaigning platform

Examples Under 200 ft
Name	Image	Year	Status	Shipyard	LOA	Beam	Masts & Type	Hull material	Sail area	Gross Tonnage	Displace- ment	Note
Eendracht		1989	S	Scheeps werf Damen, Nederlands	194 ft (59 m)	40.3 ft (12.3 m)	3-mast gaff schooner	Steel	1,206 m^{2}	606 BRT; 181 NRT		Sail trainer. W. de V. Lentsch Jr.
Götheborg		2003	F	Terra Nova shipyard, Gothenburg	190.3 ft (58.0 m)	36.1 ft (11.0 m)	full-rigged ship	Wood	1964 m^{2}	788 GT; 166 DWT		Large operational wooden sailing ship
STS Fryderyk Chopin		1992	S	Dora Shipyard, Gdynia, Poland	181 ft (55 m)	28 ft (8.5 m)	2-mast brig	Steel	1,200 m^{2}	306	400	Sail training,
INS Sudarshini		2012	S	Goa Shipyard, India	177 ft (54 m)	28 ft (8.5 m)	3-mast barque	Steel	1,035 m^{2}		513 tons	Sail trainer
INS Tarangini		1997	S	Goa Shipyard, India	177 ft (54 m)	28 ft (8.5 m)	3-mast barque	Steel	1,035 m^{2}		513 tons	Sail trainer
Royal Albatross		2001	S	Dentons Ship Yard, Charleston, SC, USA	154 ft (47 m)	25 ft (7.6 m)	4-mast barque	Steel	653 m^{2}		276 tons	Luxury Tall Ship
T/S Gunilla		1940	S	Oskarshamn Shipyard	164 ft (50 m)	27 ft (8,3 m)	3-mast barque	Steel	1,040 m^{2}		405 tons	Sail trainer
Harvey Gamage		1973	S	Harvey Gamage Shipyard	131 ft (40 m)	24 ft (7.3 m)	2-mast Gaff Rigged	Wood	4,200 ft^{2} (390 m^{2})			Training Ship
Orion Tullan Earl of Pembroke		1945	S	Pukavik, Sweden	145 ft (44.2 m)	23 ft (7.5 m)	3-mast Barque	Wood	695 m^{2}	178	350	Charters, movie work, passengers
Monte Cristo; Endeavour II		1968	H		140 ft (43 m)		3-mast barque	Wood	9,000 ft^{2} (840 m^{2})		200 tons	Sail with small auxiliary diesel
Atyla		1984	S	Handmade. Soria, Spain and Lekeitio, Spain	102 ft (31 m)	26 ft (7.9 m)	2-mast schooner	Wood (Iroko)	500 m^{2}		132 tons	Sail training

== See also ==
- List of motor yachts by length
- List of cruise ships
- List of longest wooden ships

Sail—

- List of clipper ships
- List of American-Built Extreme Clipper Ships
- List of schooners
- List of large sailing yachts
