= Neoliner Origin =

Sail-powered cargo ship

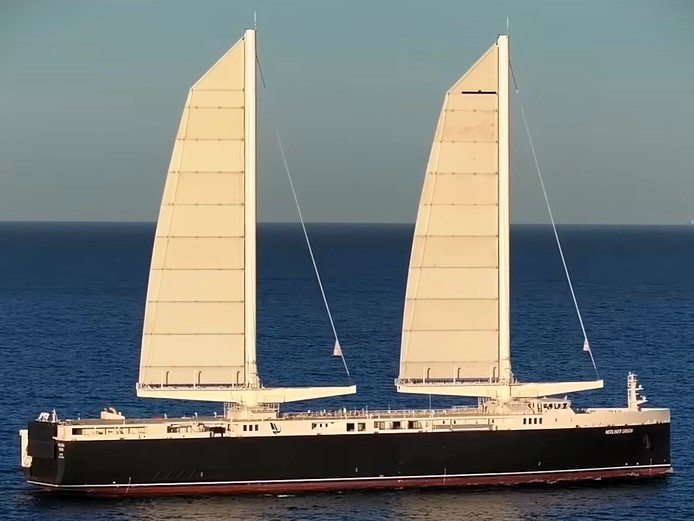
- Neoliner Origin in 2025

History

France
- Name: Neoliner Origin
- Owner: Neoline
- Builder: RMK Marine shipyard, Tuzla, Turkey
- Cost: €60 million
- Laid down: November 2023
- Launched: Early 2025
- Home port: Nantes, France

General characteristics
- Class & type: Sail-powered roll-on/roll-off (ro-ro) cargo ship
- Length: 136 m (446 ft)
- Beam: 24.2 m (79 ft)
- Draft: 5.5 m (18 ft)
- Propulsion: 2 SolidSail units + diesel engine, 0.9 MW electric motor
- Sail plan: Two 76-metre (249 ft) sail masts; sail area: 3,000 m^{2} (32,000 sq ft)
- Speed: 16 knots (30 km/h) (max), 9 kts (cruise)
- Capacity: 5,300 t (5,200 long tons)
- Crew: 20

Neoliner Origin is the first sail-powered roll-on/roll-off (ro-ro) cargo ship. It began service on a transatlantic route in 2025. The vessel was developed by French company Neoline with the goal of reducing carbon emissions for merchant shipping. It is the largest sail-powered ro-ro cargo ship in the world as of 2026.

== Development ==
Neoline is a shipping company founded in 2015 by Jean Zanuttini and nine co-founders, with a vision of prioritising environmental responsibility. Development of Neoliner Origin began in 2016, and in 2025 the vessel became the company's first vessel to be put into service.

== Specifications ==
Neoliner Origin uses sails as its main propulsion. It is also equipped with a diesel-electric hybrid propulsion system for port maneuvres and backup power. The ship is 136 metres (446 ft) in length, with a cargo capacity of 5,300 tonnes, or 256 twenty-foot equivalent unit containers. It was the largest sail-powered cargo ship in the world as of 2025 before being surpassed by sail-powered tanker ships bulk carriers.

The vessel features two 1,500-square-metre (16,000 sq ft) SolidSail sails, which were developed by Chantiers de l'Atlantique. The two SolidSail units are mounted on 76-metre (249 ft) masts, which can be lowered to allow passage beneath bridges and other structures with limited air-draft. Neoliner Origin has a maximum speed of 16 knots (18 mph; 30 km/h), with a cruising speed of 9 knots (10 mph; 17 km/h) using only the sails. It also has fins to counter lateral drift, designed by Fouré Lagadec.

== Construction ==
Construction of the vessel began in November 2023. The hull of Neoliner Origin was built at RMK Marine shipyard in Tuzla, Turkey, where it was launched early in 2025. Installation of the masts and sails was completed separately.

After the completion of sea trials, the ship was handed over to its owner in September 2025 with a cost of €60 million. On the ship's delivery journey from Turkey to Saint-Nazaire, Neoliner Origin paused in Bastia for its first loading operation.

== Operation ==
=== First transatlantic voyage ===
Neoliner Origin's first transatlantic voyage was completed in October 2025, taking eight days from Saint-Nazaire to Saint Pierre and Miquelon (off the Canadian coast) en route to Baltimore.

Among the cargo on the maiden voyage was a shipment from French cosmetics company Clarins. Clarins and Neoline have been in partnership since 2021 seeking more sustainable shipping.

=== First year ===
By 2026, the ship operates mainly on wind, with 78% fuel savings equivalent to 17 tonnes of fuel per trip, compared with a similar conventional vessel on the same route at the same speed.

== See also ==
- List of large sailing vessels
