= Duvelleroy =

French fan maker and leather goods manufacturer

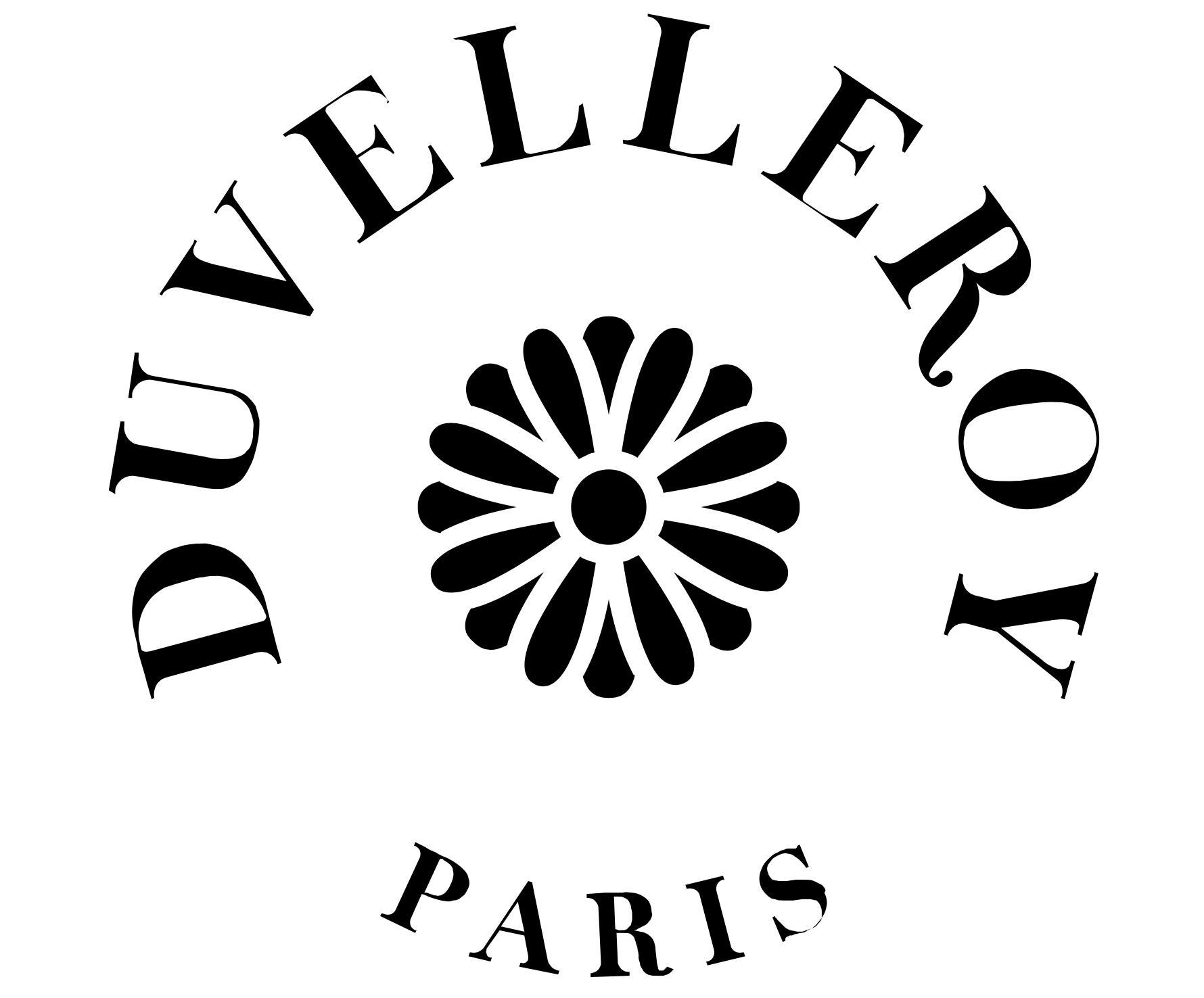

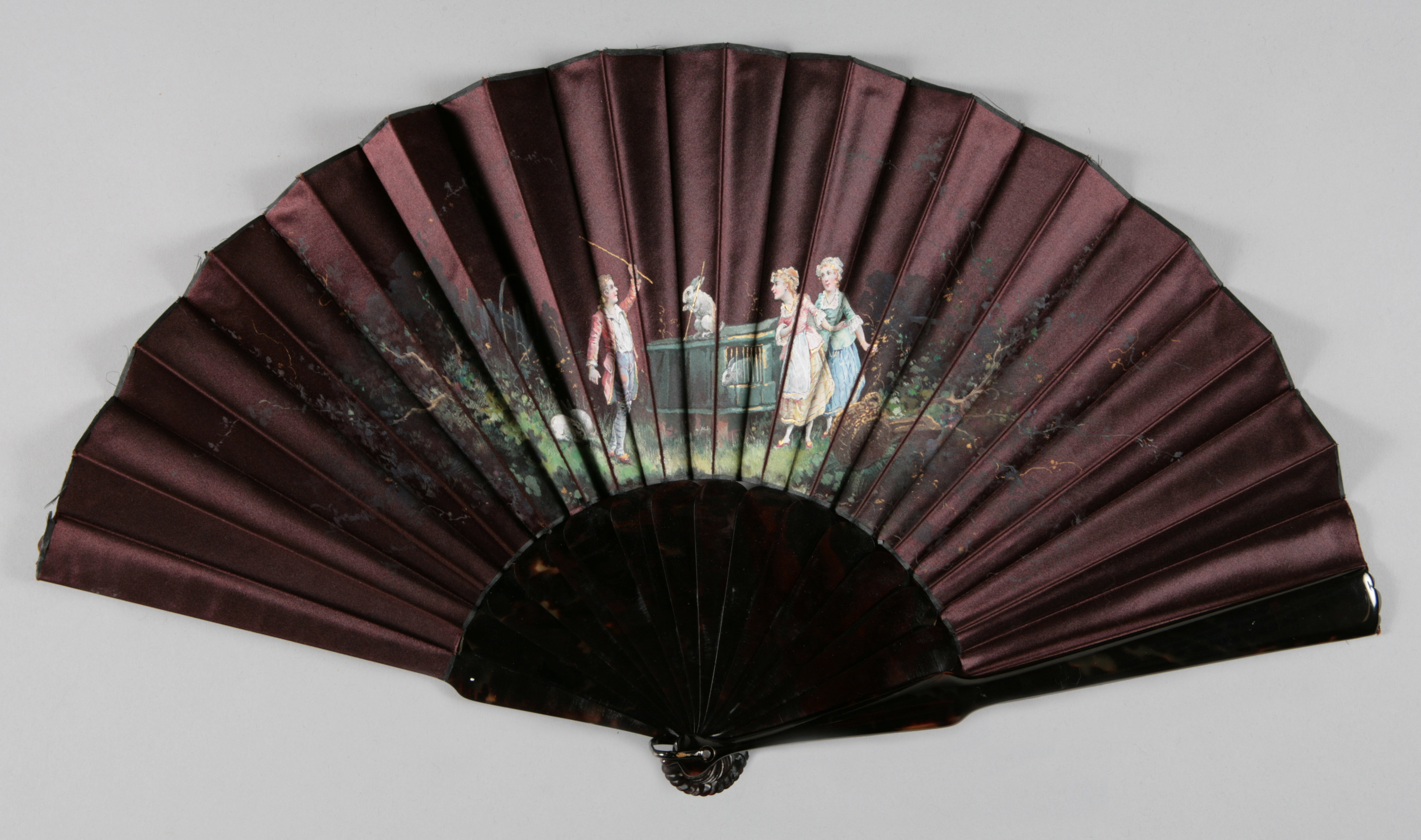
- A Duvelleroy fan from the 1880s
- Founded: 1827
- Founder: Jean-Pierre Duvelleroy
- Headquarters: 17 Rue Amélie, Paris, France
- Products: Fans
- Website: eventail-duvelleroy.fr

Duvelleroy is a fan maker and leather goods manufacturer based in Paris, France. The house was founded in 1827 by Jean-Pierre Duvelleroy, and stands today as one of the rare French fan makers still in existence.

== History ==
In 1827, as Paris had no more than fifteen fan-makers, an accessory that had gone out of fashion after the French Revolution. 25-year-old Jean-Pierre Duvelleroy established his own fan house in the city, relying on the demand for fans in South America (primary export market for French fan makers) to help him start his business.

In March 1829, during a ball given by the Duchess of Berry at the Tuileries Palace, the quadrille women sported fans, bringing the fan trend back. The house opened a boutique at 15, rue de la Paix, and its ateliers were established at 17, passage des Panoramas in Paris. The house produced fan sticks and guards from precious wood, horn, mother of pearl, ivory or tortoise shell made by stick makers (or 'tabletiers') traditionally based in the Oise region of France. For the leaves of his fans, he collaborated with artists such as Ingres or Delacroix for exceptional pieces.

In 1851, Duvelleroy was awarded the prize medal at The Crystal Palace. The Duvelleroys, father and son, were each president of the Syndicate of Fan-makers, and both received the French Légion d’Honneur. After making a fan representing the Royal Family of England, based on a painting by Winterhalter, Duvelleroy was appointed supplier to Queen Victoria and opened a boutique in London. Soon enough, Duvelleroy fans were sold in all major courts of Europe. In 1853, Duvelleroy made a fan for the wedding of Eugénie de Montijo to Emperor Napoleon III. Later, the house was nominated exclusive supplier of the City of Paris, making the fans given to the wives of foreign sovereigns and dignitaries coming to Paris for official visits, such as the Empress of Russia, the Queen of Sweden, the Queen of Denmark, and the Queen of Bulgaria.

Jean-Pierre Duvelleroy gave the London Duvelleroy house to his elder son, Jules, born out of wedlock, while he handed over the management of the Paris house to his legitimate son, Georges Duvelleroy.

By duty of memory, Michel Maignan conserved the Duvelleroy Fund, which his grandfather passed on to him in 1981. This Fund is made of fans, drawings, tools, materials and furnishings kept since the foundation of the House of Duvelleroy in 1827. "I give it to you so that you can make something out of it", he said. In 1986, an exhibit dedicated to the Fan as a mirror of the Belle Époque was given in Paris: many Duvelleroy fans were exhibited on this occasion. Since then, many publications and exhibits have been developed, referring to Duvelleroy. In 1995, an exhibit in England was entirely dedicated to the House: Duvelleroy, King of Fans, Fanmaker to Kings.

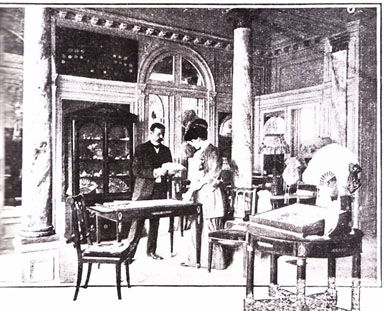
Duvelleroy Boutique. 19th century.

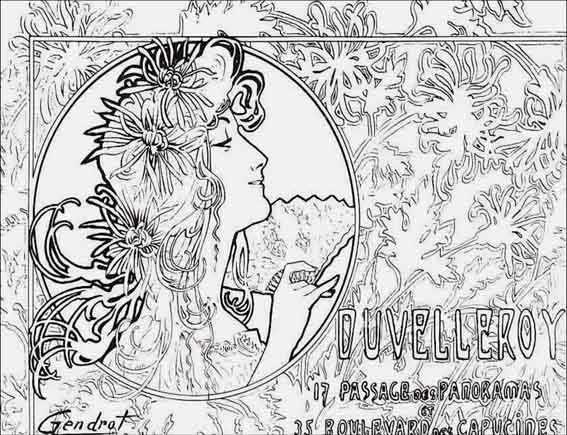
Duvelleroy by Gendrot, 1905.

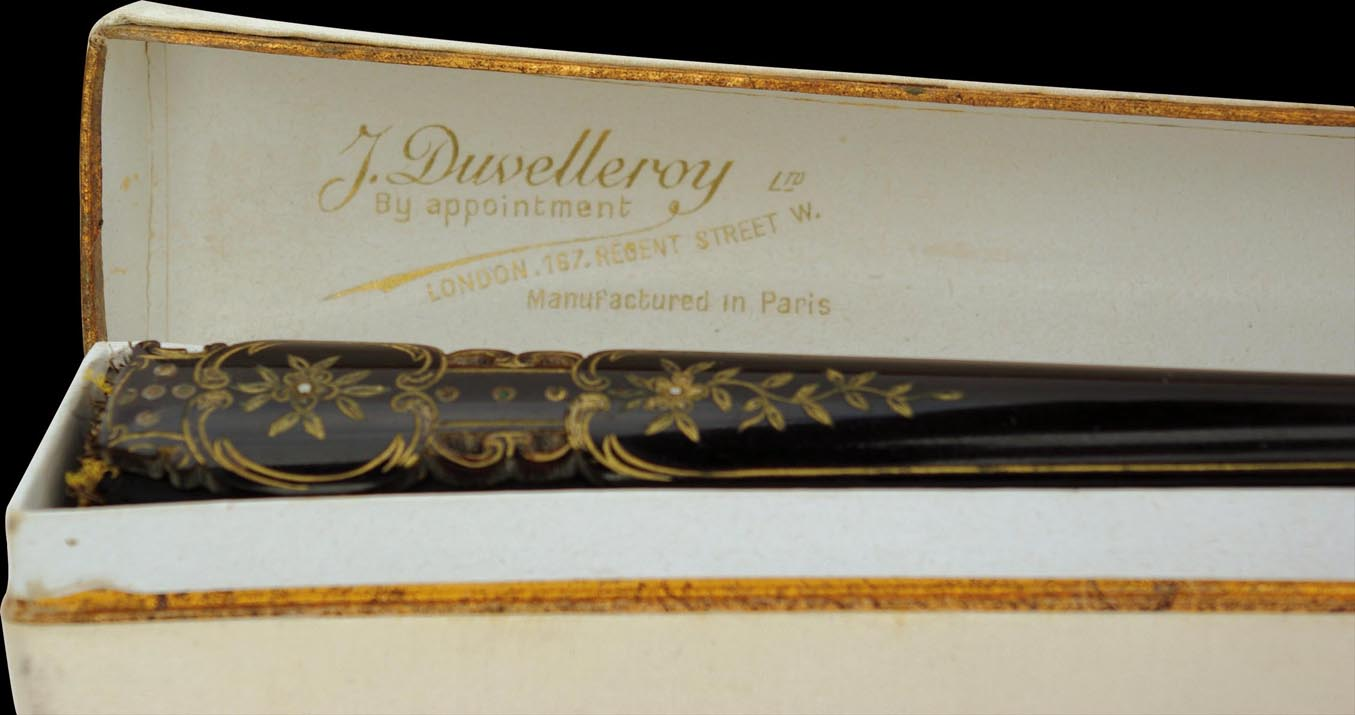
Duvelleroy fan case, 1905.

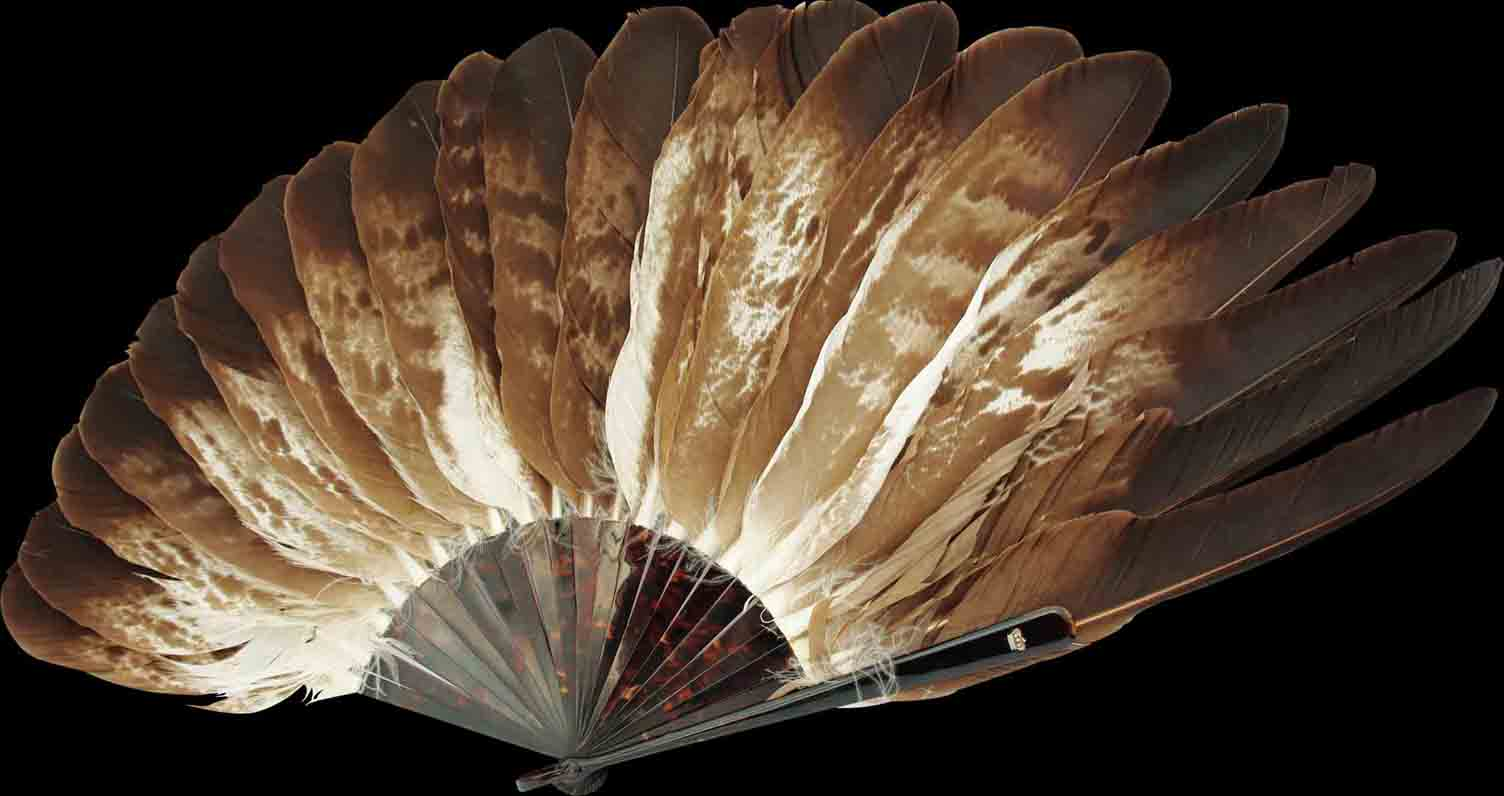
Duvelleroy fan, 1920.

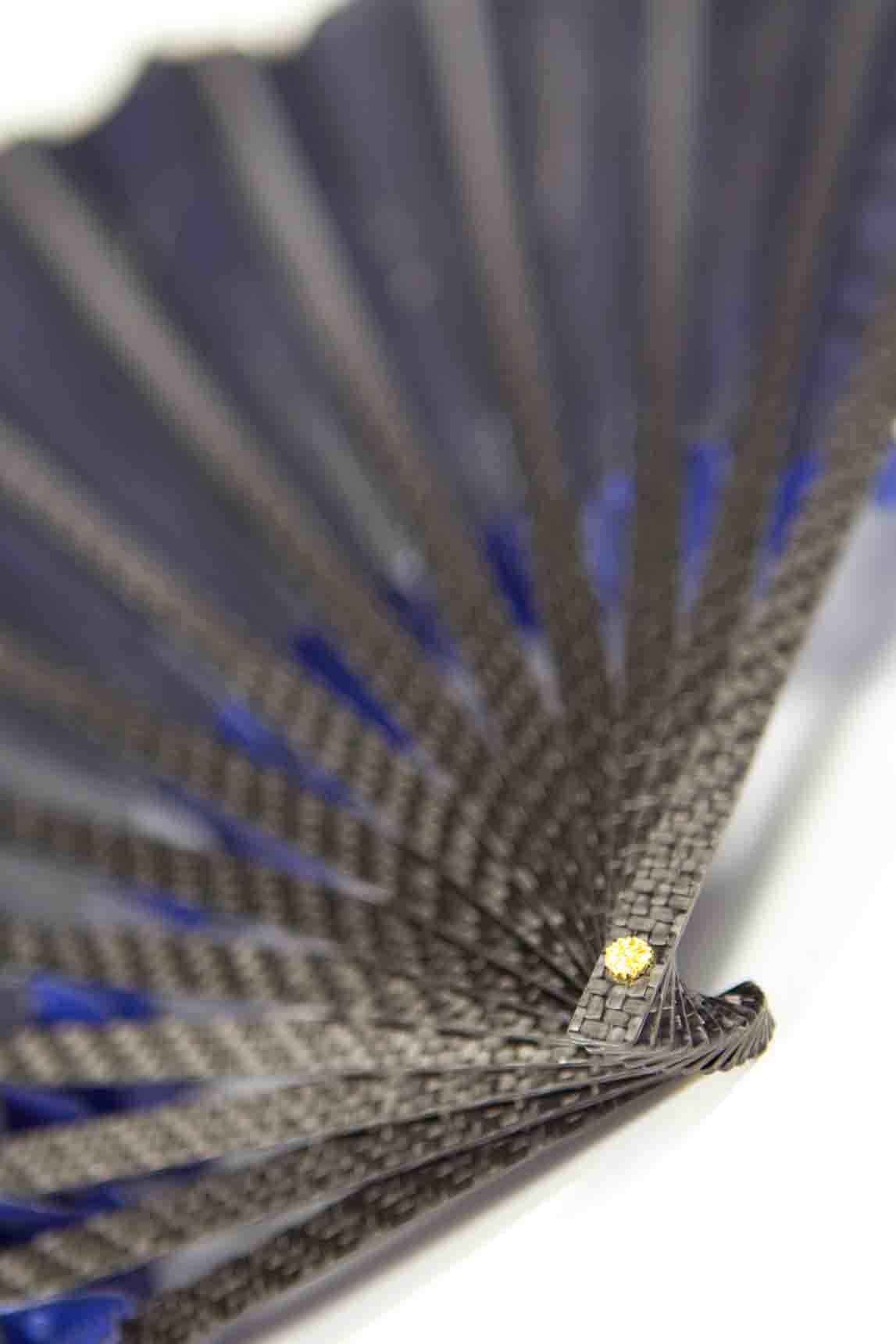
Duvelleroy fan, 2010.

== Language of the fan ==
In London, Jules Duvelleroy published a 'language of the fan' leaflets, a whole code supposedly used by women for centuries. Some of those codes were:

- "We are watched": Twirl the fan in the left hand
- "Follow me": Carry the fan in the right hand in front of face
- "Do not betray our secret": Cover the left ear with the open fan
- "I hate you": Draw the fan through the hand
- "I love you": Draw the fan across the cheek
- "I wish to speak to you": Touch the tip of the fan with the finger
- "Yes.": Let the fan rest on the right cheek
- "No": Let the fan rest on the left cheek
- "You are cruel": Open and shut the fan
- "We will be friends": Drop the fan
- "I am married": Fan slowly
- "I am engaged": Fan rapidly
- "Kiss me": Bring the handle of the fan to the lip

== See also ==
- Fan (implement)

== Bibliography ==
- "Fan", The Grove Encyclopedia of Decorative Arts, Edited by Gordon Campbell, Oxford University Press, 2006 ISBN 978-0-19-532494-5
- Lucie Saboudjian, Ph. John Keyser, Ils collectionnent…Les Eventails, Trouvailles, N°43, Novembre / Décembre 1983 (M2791-43, ISSN 0396-6356)
- Musée de la Mode et du Costume, L’Eventail, Miroir de la Belle Epoque, Ville de Paris, 15 May 1985 ISBN 2-901424-07-4
- Michel Maignan, "L’éventail, De l’attribut sacré à l’accessoire de séduction", Demeures & Châteaux, N°36, Juillet/Août/Septembre 1986 (M1512-36)
- Christl Kammerl, Der Fächer, Kunstobjekt und Billetdoux, Hirmer Verlag München, Münich, 1990 ISBN 3-7774-5270-X
- The Fan Museum, Duvelleroy – King of Fans, Fanmaker to Kings, catalogue de l’exposition du 3 October 95 au 21 January 96 au Fan Museum Greenwich, Londres, 1995
- Hélène Alexander, Fans, Shire Publications Ltd., Buckinghamshire, 2002 ISBN 0-7478-0402-8
- Hélène Alexander, Russel Harris, Presenting a Cooling Image, Photography by the Lafayette Studio of Bond Street and Fans from The Fan Museum Greenwich, The Fan Museum, Greenwich, Londres, 2007 ISBN 0-9540319-4-6
- Fabienne Falluel, Marie-Laure Gutton, Élégance et Système D, Paris 1940–1944, Paris Musées, Les Collections de la Ville de Paris, mars 2009, Actes Sud ISBN 978-2-7596-0064-9
- Charles Knight, The English cyclopaedia, Volume 4, Page 23, 1867
- Jules Kindt, Rapport de la Commission Belge de l’Exposition Universelle de Paris en 1867, tome II, pages 327–8, Bruxelles, Imprimerie Et Lithographie de E. Guyot, 1868
- Barbé-Conti, Marie-Clémence (2020). Duvelleroy « Trésors de l'éventail couture parisien » [Duvelleroy « Treasures of the couture parisian fan »] (in French). Fine éditions d’art. ISBN 978-2-902302-38-3.
