= Murder on the Orient Express (disambiguation) =

Murder on the Orient Express is a 1934 detective novel by Agatha Christie.

Murder on the Orient Express may also refer to:

== Film ==
- Murder on the Orient Express (1974 film), film based on the novel, directed by Sidney Lumet, starring Albert Finney
- Murder on the Orient Express (2017 film), film based on the novel, directed by and starring Kenneth Branagh

== Television ==
- "Murder on the Orient Express" (11 July 2010), an episode in British TV series Agatha Christie's Poirot, starring David Suchet
- Murder on the Orient Express (2001 film), a film made for television based on the novel, starring Alfred Molina

== Other media ==
- Murder on the Orient Express (28 December 1992 - 1 January 1993), a BBC Radio 4 adaptation starring John Moffatt as Poirot
- Agatha Christie: Murder on the Orient Express (2006), a PC game based on the novel

== See also ==
- Orient Express, the train service
- Stamboul Train (1932), a Graham Greene novel published in the United States as Orient Express (unrelated to the Agatha Christie novel)
- Mummy on the Orient Express, an episode of Doctor Who
