= Royal Albatross (ship) =

Privately owned, four-masted Barquentine, luxury super yacht

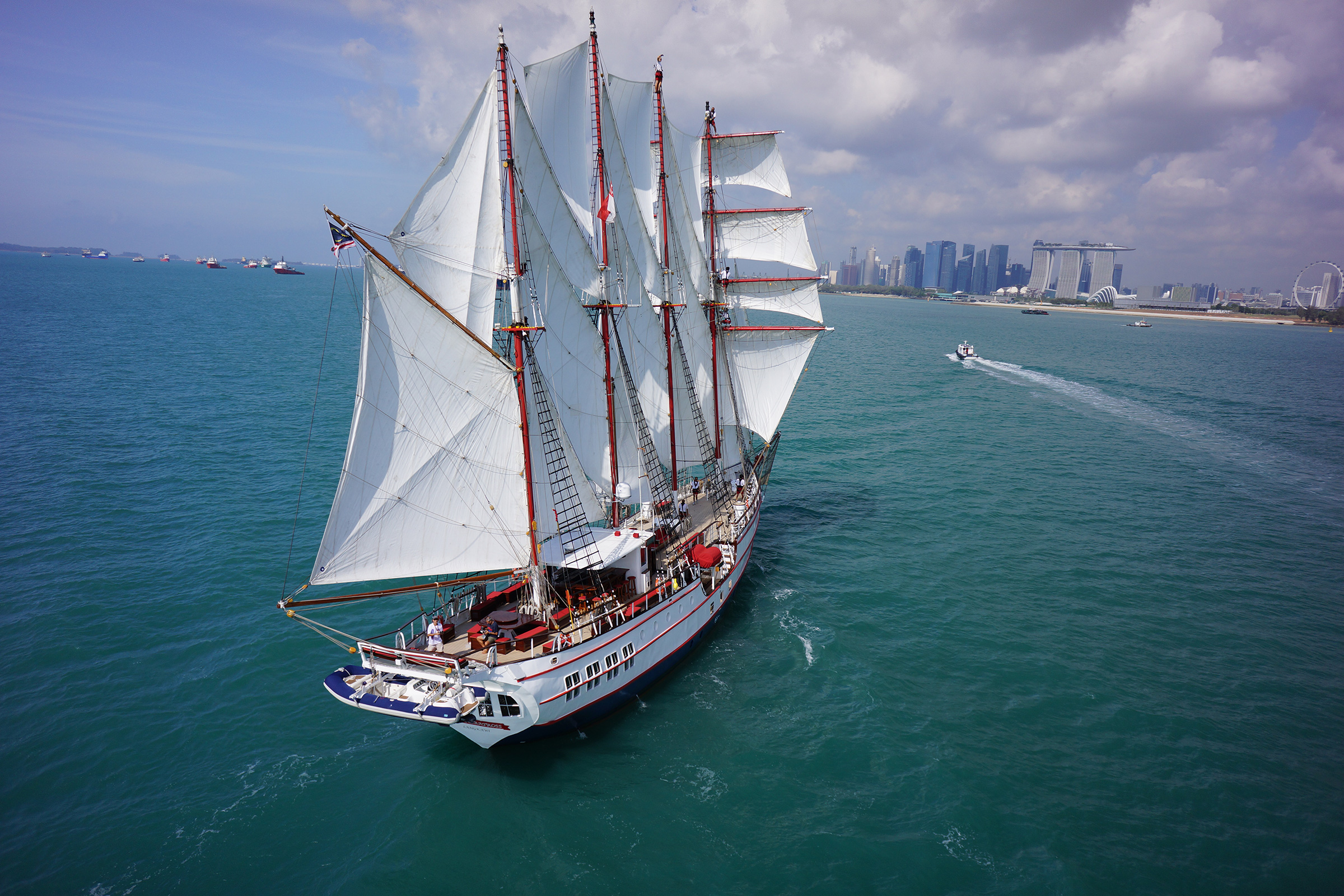
- The Royal Albatross sailing along Singapore's East Coast

History

Singapore
- Name: Royal Albatross
- Owner: Tall Ship Adventures Pte Ltd
- Operator: Tall Ship Adventures Pte Ltd
- Port of registry: Langkawi International Yacht Registry (LIYR)
- Builder: Dentons Ship Yard, Charleston, SC, USA
- Launched: 2001
- Renamed: 2011
- Home port: Singapore
- Identification: IMO number: 9563823; MMSI number: 563011780; Callsign: 9V4011
- Status: active

Royal Albatross is a privately owned, four-masted barquentine, luxury superyacht. She operates from her home berth at Resorts World Sentosa on the island of Sentosa, Singapore. Royal Albatross is a luxury tall ship with four masts, 22 sails, more than 200 ropes, three decks and is comparable with a luxury yacht; but looks and operates like a galleon. Her sails and rigging were designed by Jim Barry who designed the ship for the Pirates of the Caribbean movies. After a 5.5-year reconstruction, Royal Albatross has a passenger capacity of 200 (alongside) and 149 (sailing) on a continuous upper deck.

Royal Albatross started her life in Chicago where she was known as Windy II, cruising the Great Lakes prior to a journey in 2008 that brought her over 15,000 kilometres (9,300 mi) from the temperate climates of North America to the tropical waters of South East Asia. She was the first U.S. certified four-masted barquentine since 1920. Since arriving in Singapore, approximately 360,000 hours were invested in re-designing, re-fitting and certifying Royal Albatross to operate commercially in Singapore and beyond. Her current specifications features 22 sails, 650 square metres (7,000 sq ft) of canvas, and over 60,000 RGB lights.

== Background ==
In 2001, Royal Albatross was first launched as Windy II, the twin sister of tall ship Windy and operated on the Great Lakes from Navy Pier in Chicago. Windy II was renamed Royal Albatross in 2011.

In 2008, when the Royal Albatross first arrived in Singapore, she was certified by the U.S. Coast Guard and was licensed to carry a maximum of 150 passengers. However, the Marine Port Authority of Singapore did not recognize the license granted under the U.S. Coast Guard and agreed to issue a license to sail in Singapore waters but with a limit of 60 persons on board. In 2009, an extensive transformation process started for Royal Albatross when she was moved to Lumut, Perak, Malaysia to undergo hull strengthening, steel fabrication, ventilation works, exterior carpentry and engine room fitting. She was essentially stripped to her bare hull and then rebuilt. There were no regional shipyards with tall ship experience so facilities were rented and an international team of experts was recruited to advise, manage and train a new crew to work on the ship. The reconstruction process in Lumut lasted two years before Royal Albatross was moved to begin her next phase of construction.

In 2011, the Royal Albatross moved to Puteri Harbour in Johor, Malaysia to begin works on her electrical systems, internal piping and interior carpentry. The process took another two years before moving back to Singapore for the final stage of the reconstruction. In 2013, the Royal Albatross moved to Raffles Marina in Singapore to complete her six-year transformation process with detailing, furnishing, and crew training. She also attained her certifications in 2013. The Royal Albatross was rebuilt from the keel up to be a luxury super yacht while maintaining her traditional Barquentine Class A certification while complying with RINA class, International Load-line and passenger safety requirements of the Marine Port Authority of Singapore (MPA). Royal Albatross is certified as a commercial passenger ship in Singapore and international waters under the RINA Certification and is licensed by MPA to carry 162 passengers on board.

== Capacity and specifications ==
Capacity

- 12 Crew including accommodation
- Day Sailing: 149 Guests (excluding crew)
- Alongside: 180 Guests
- Overnight Charter: 10 Guests

Specifications

- Original built year: 2001
- Reconstruction year: 2008–2014
- Flag: LIYR (Malaysia)
- Hull: Steel
- Displacement: 276 tons
- Length: 47 m
- Length on deck: 34 m
- Beam: 7.6 m
- Draft: 3.8 m
- Type: Barquentine Tall Ship (Class-A)
- Class: RINA Yacht
- Masts: 4 Aluminum masts
- Sails: 22 (653 sq.meters)
- Rig: Staysail (w/square sail)
- Air draft: 28.5m
- Engine: Cummins 1 X 430 HP

== Awards and recognition ==
In 2017, the Royal Albatross received recognition at the Maritime and Shipping Awards 2017 and was awarded the APAC Excellence Award: Best Unique Superyacht.

In 2022, the Royal Albatross received the Outstanding Attraction Award, along with Mandai Wildlife Reserve, at the Singapore Tourism Awards 2022.

== Notable Appearances ==
The Royal Albatross has appeared as locations for several movies and TV shows. Notable appearances includes:

- As Bruce Wayne's super yacht in The Dark Knight by Christopher Nolan.
- Super yacht in Singapore's Channel 8 TV series drama My Guardian Angel

== Gallery ==
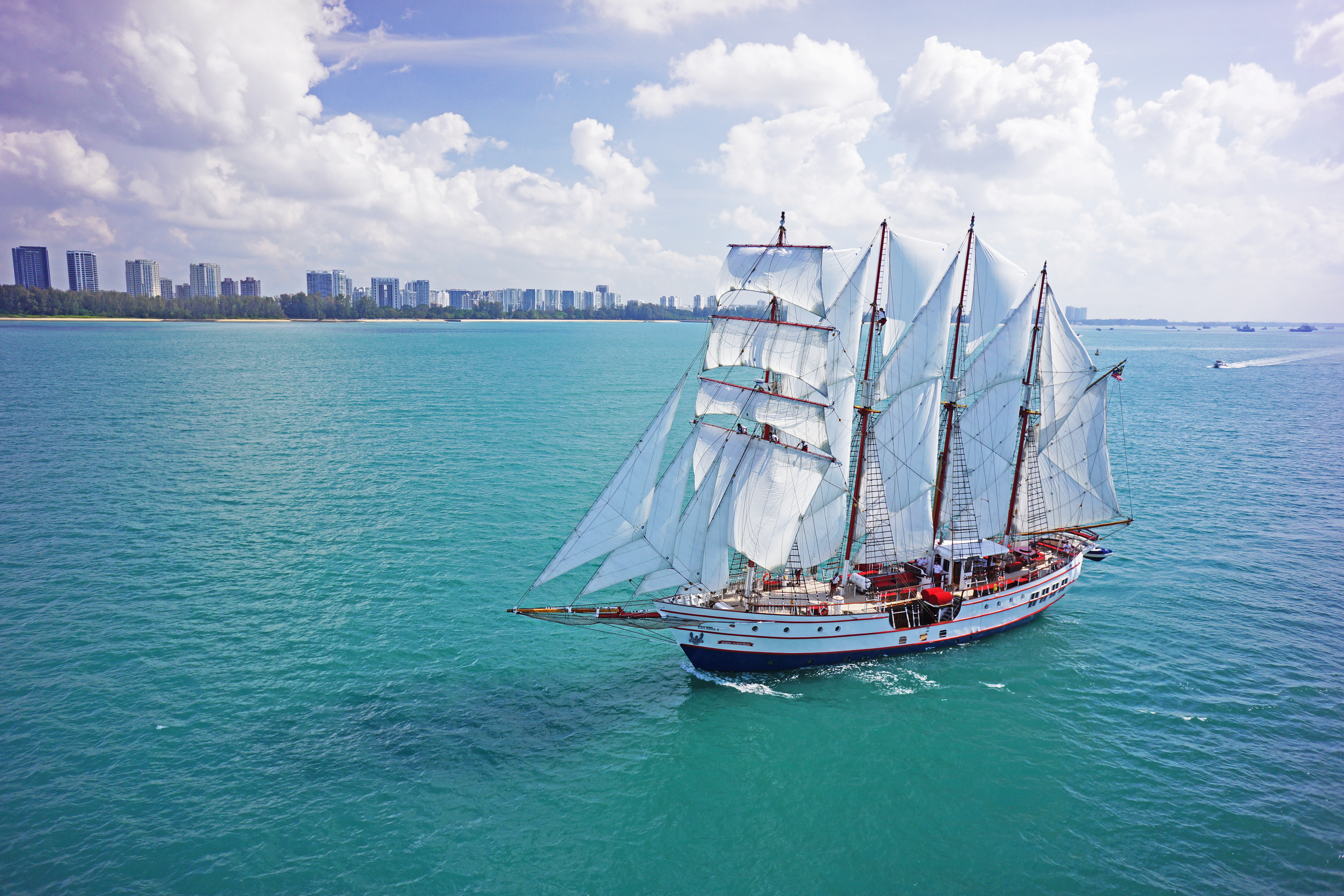
Royal Albatross under full sail

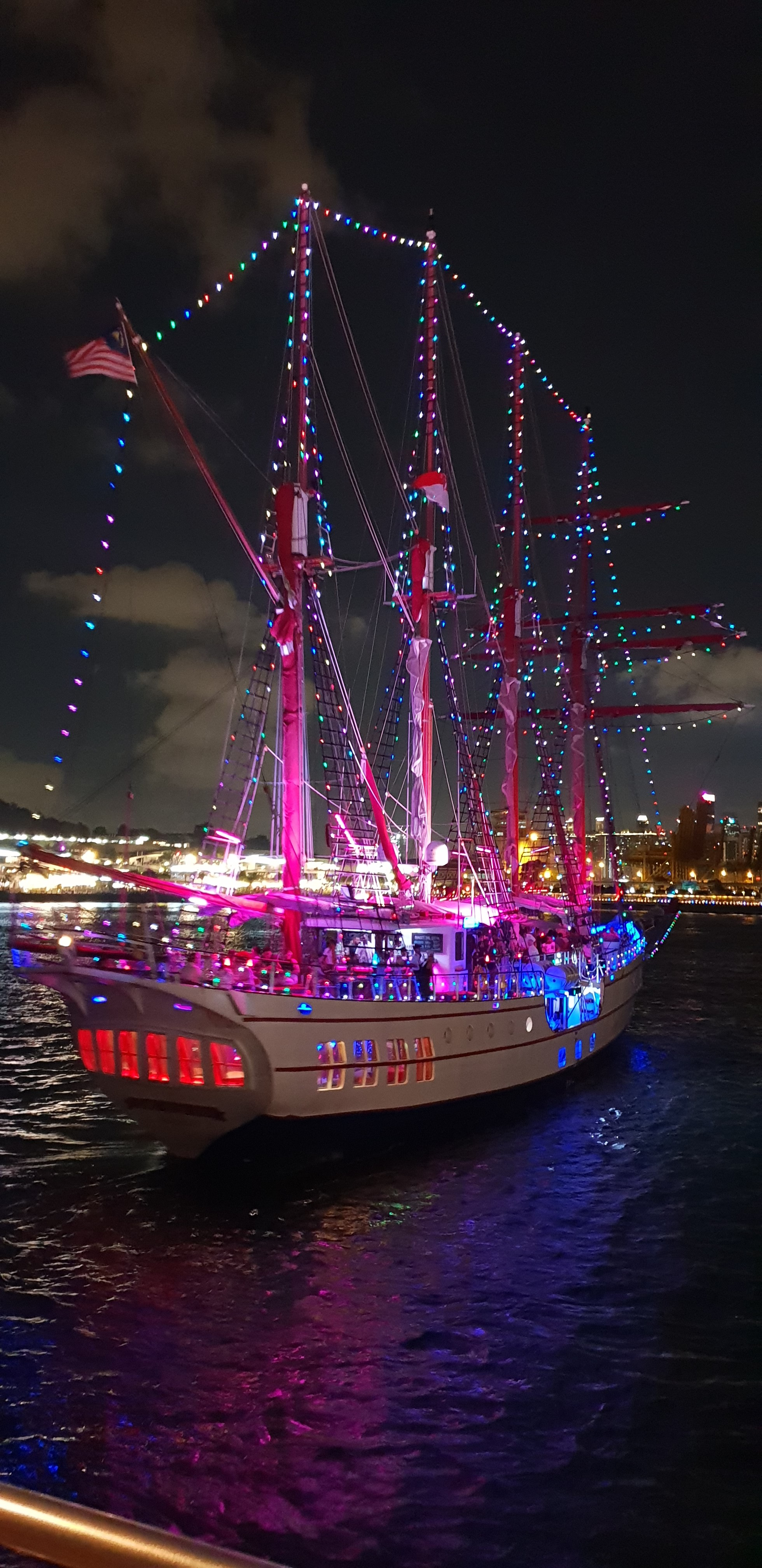
The Royal Albatross at her berth in Resorts World Sentosa, Singapore

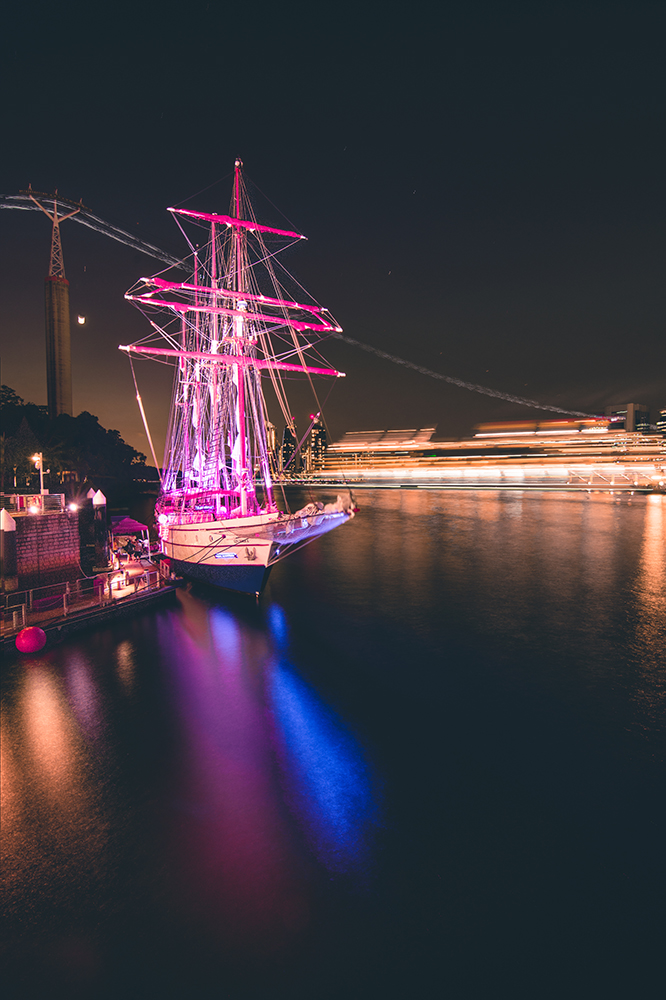
City lights view

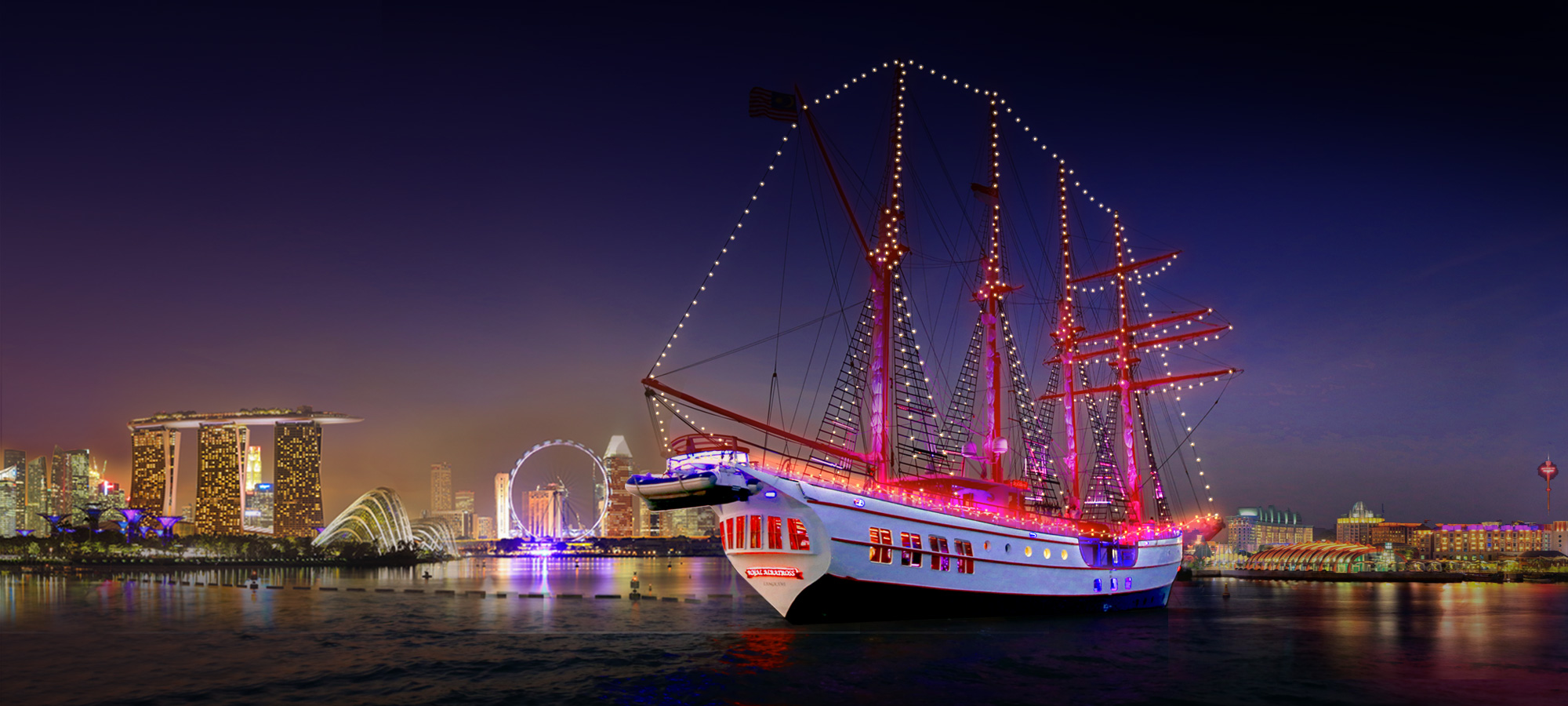
Dinner under the stars

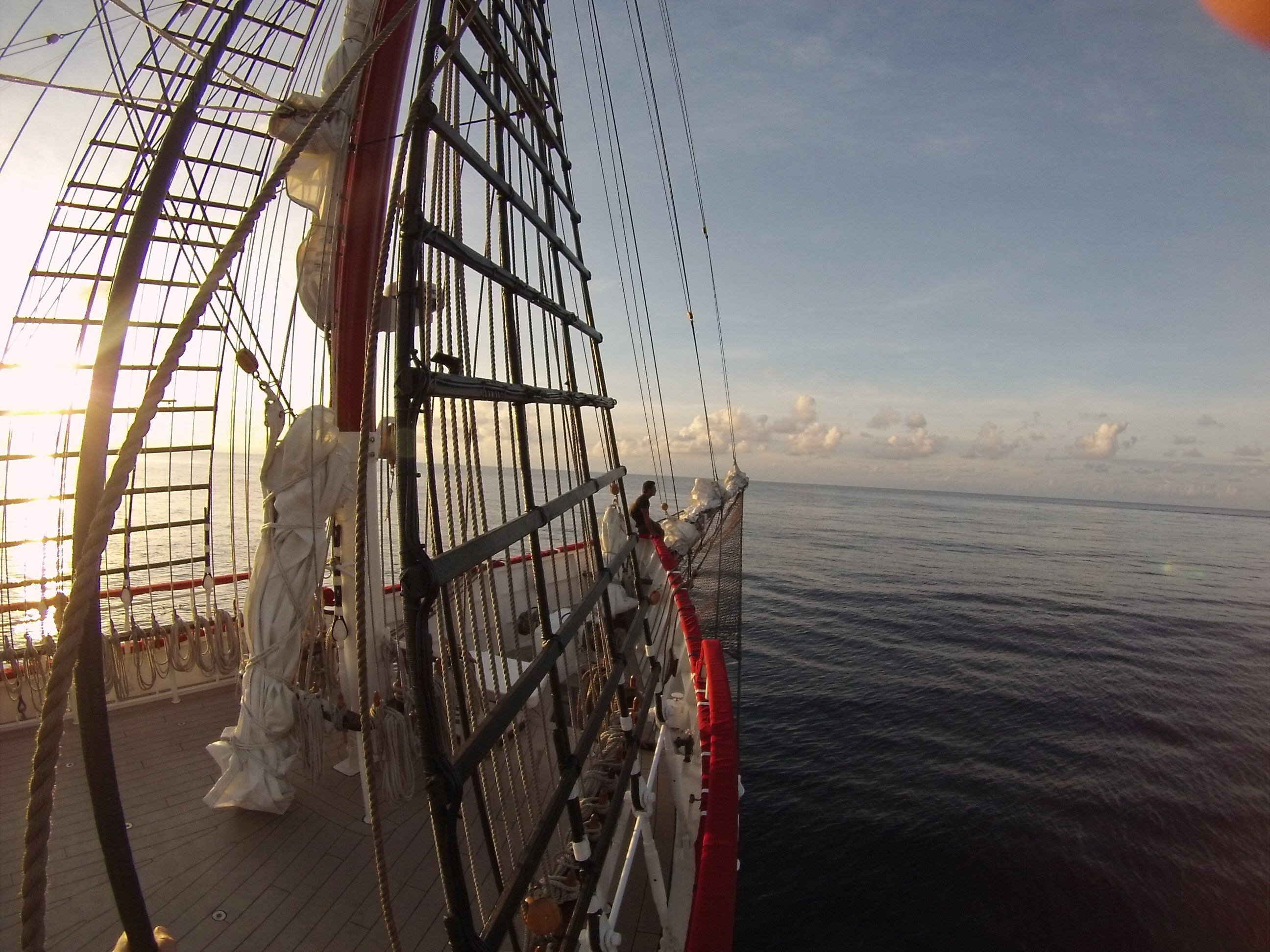
Royal Albatross underway

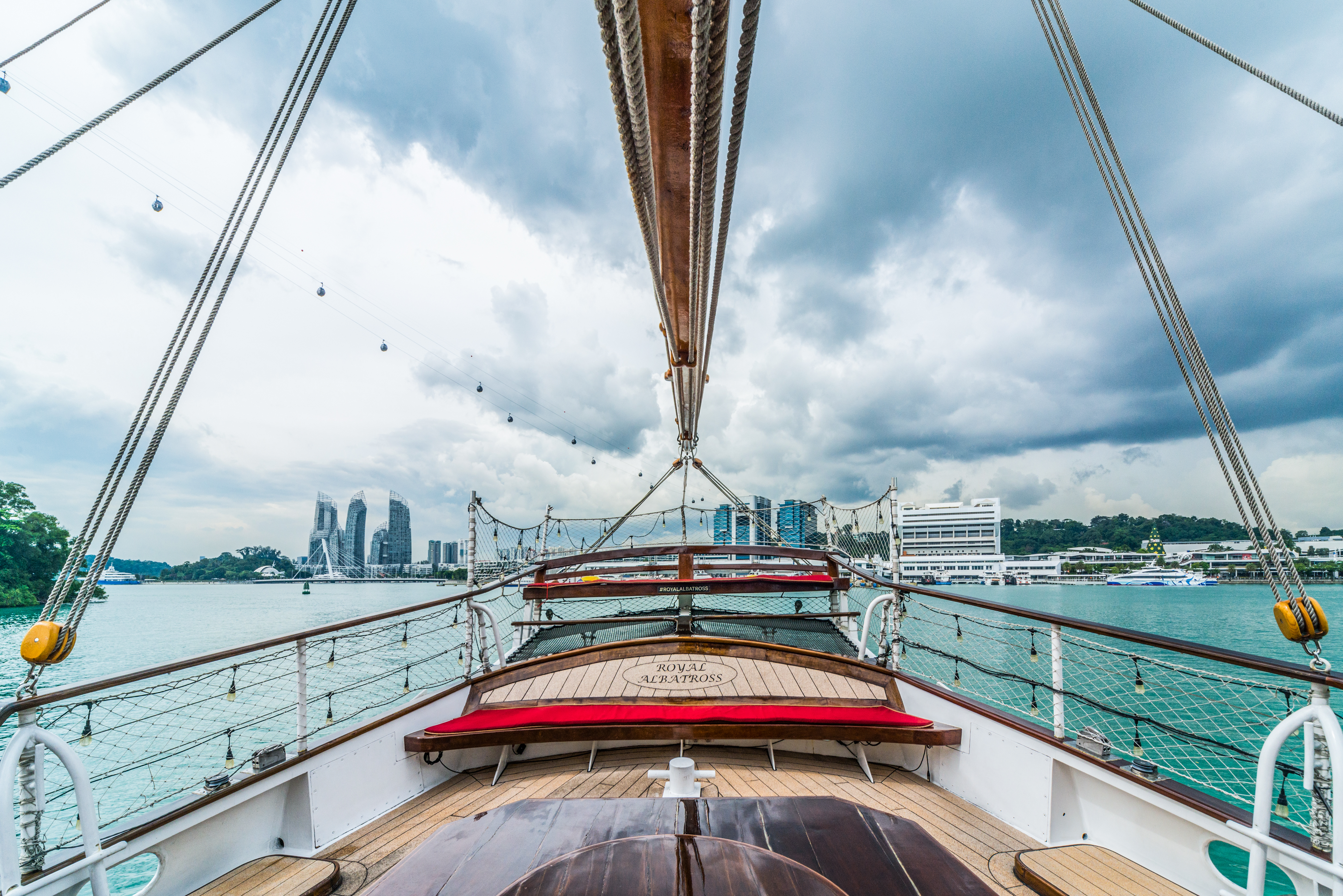
Stern view

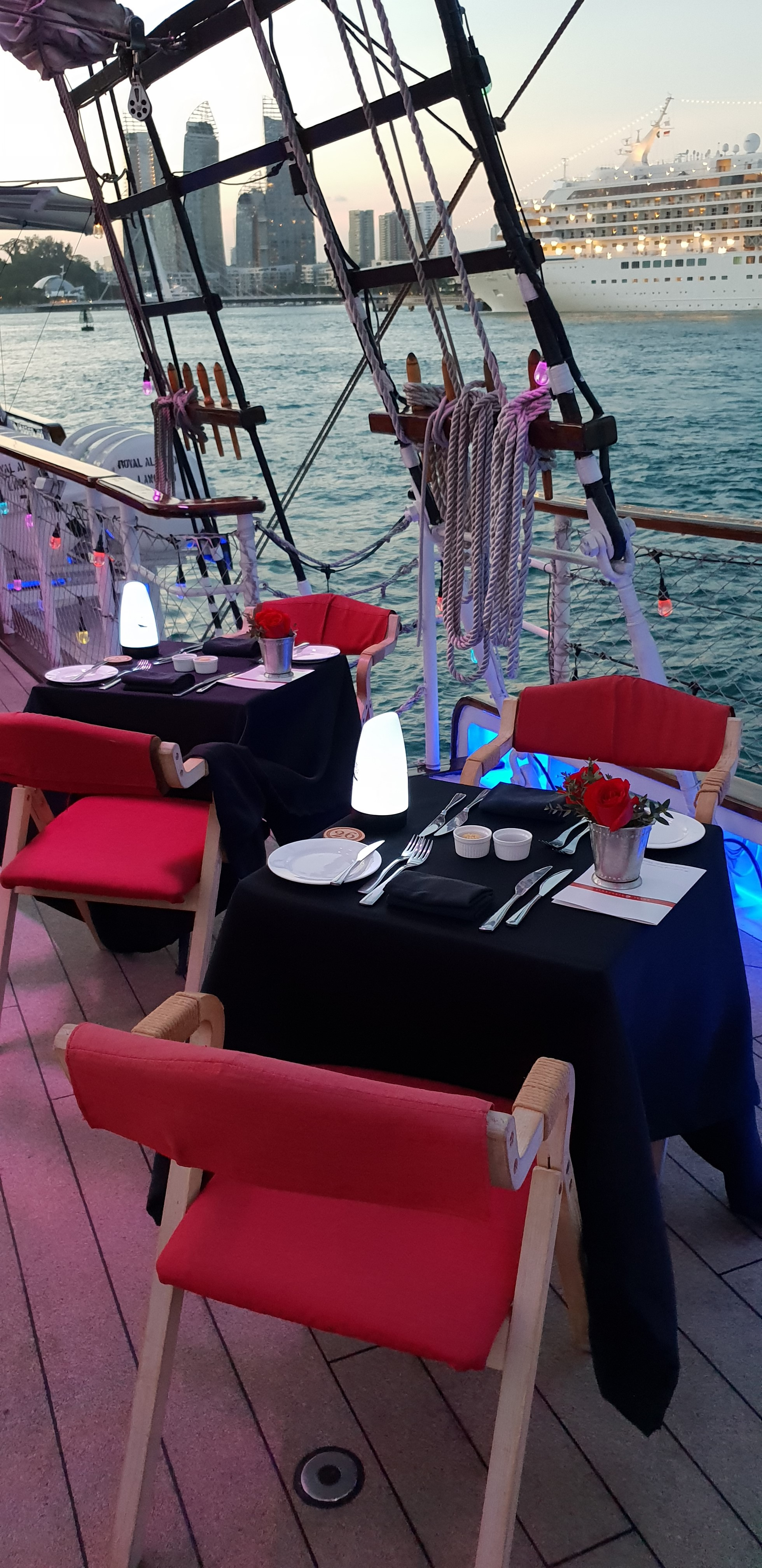
Deck

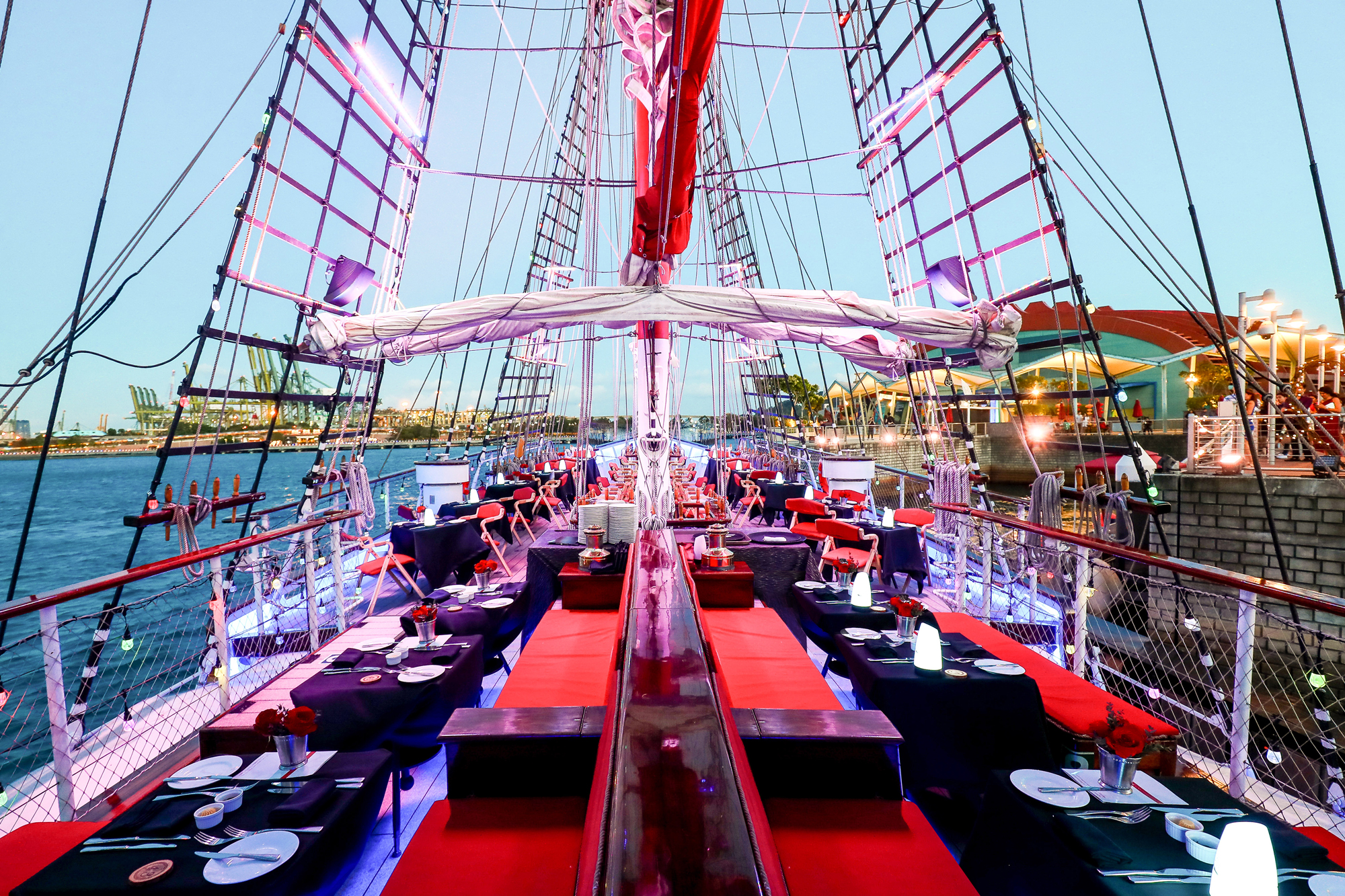
Royal Albatross Valentine's Dinner Cruise

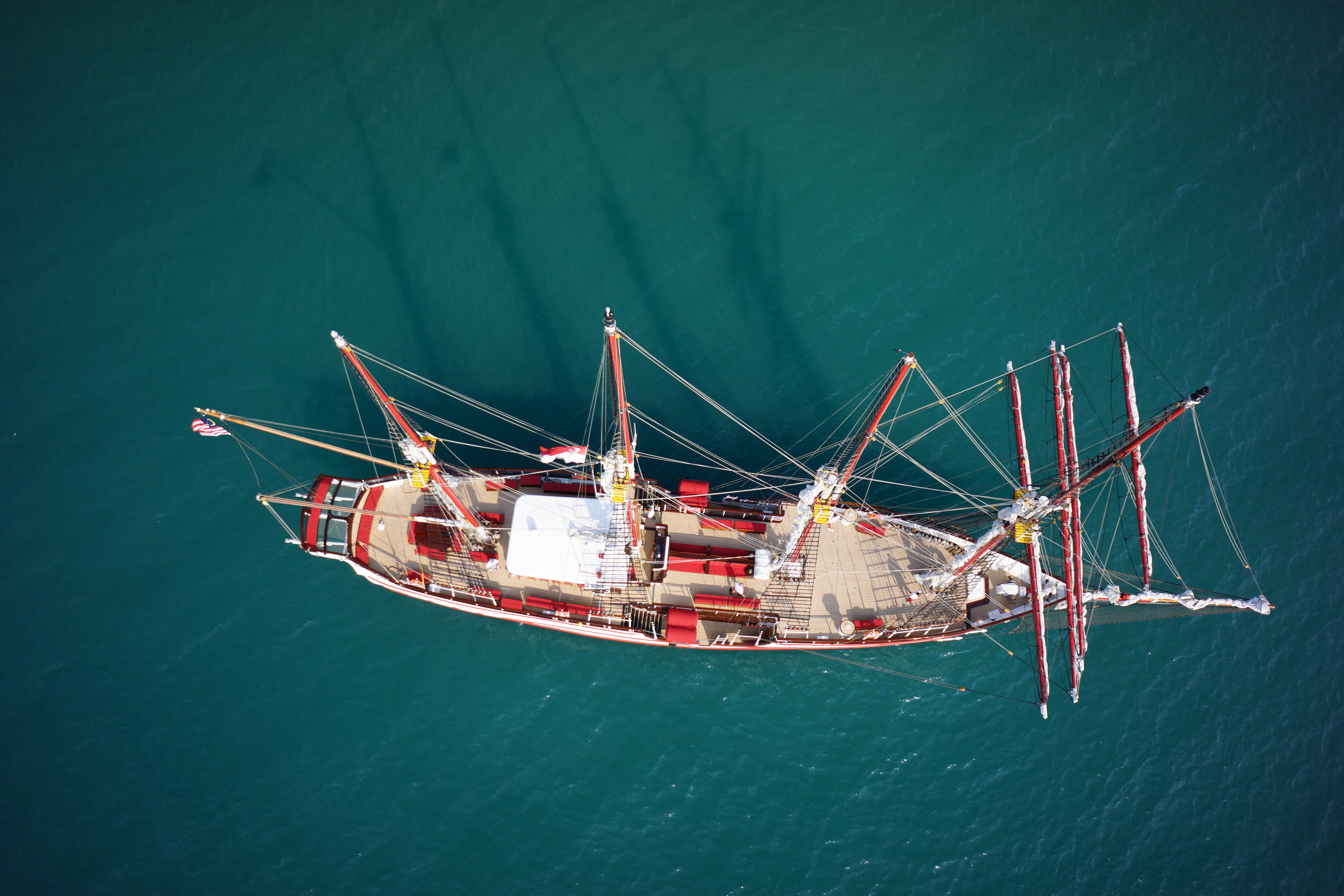
Top view

== See also ==
- Royal Clipper
- Flying Clipper
- Star Flyer
- List of large sailing vessels
