= R. C. Rickmers (1906) =

German five-masted steel clipper barque built in 1906

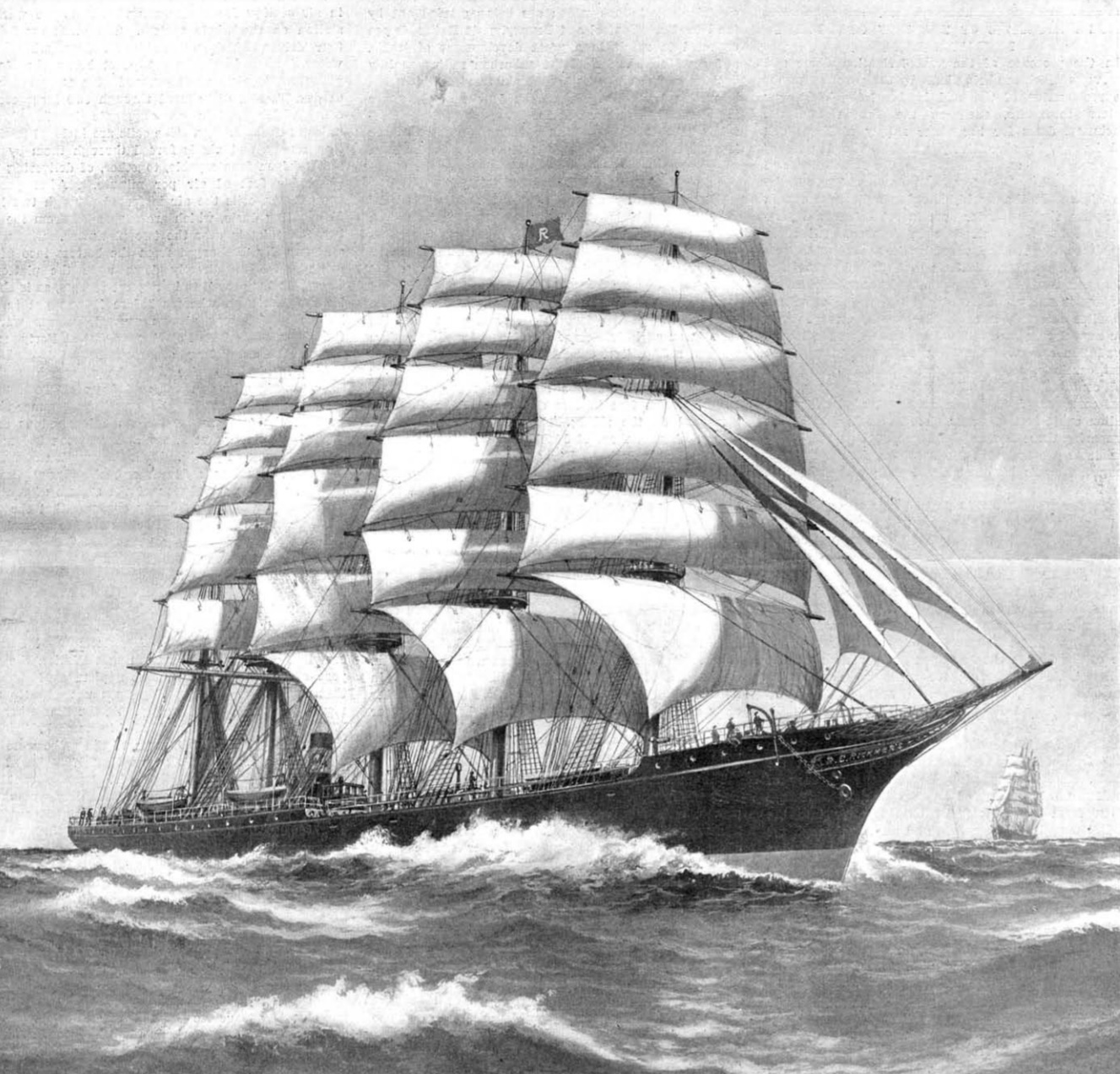
- Painting of R. C. Rickmers by C.M. Knight-Smith, c. 1906

History

German Empire
- Name: R. C. Rickmers
- Owner: 1906-1914, Rickmers Rice Mill, Freight and Shipbuilding Company
- Operator: Rickmers Line
- Launched: 8 February 1906
- Maiden voyage: Bremen to Saigon and Bangkok
- Fate: Seized by the British in August 1914

History

United Kingdom
- Name: Neath
- Owner: 1914-1917, British owner
- Fate: Sunk by the German submarine U-66 off the coast of Ireland on 27 March 1917

General characteristics
- Type: five-masted steel clipper barque with auxiliary steam engine
- Tonnage: 5,548 tons
- Displacement: 11,360 tons (on her maximum draft)
- Length: 441 feet
- Beam: 53 feet 8 inches
- Draft: 26 feet 9 inches when fully loaded
- Depth: 32 feet
- Propulsion: Sail and steam
- Sail plan: 38 (40) sails on 5 masts
- Speed: Sail: 13-14 knots; Steam: 8 knots
- Crew: ~45 men

RC Rickmers was a German five-masted steel clipper barque with auxiliary engine built in 1906 by the firm Rickmers Rice Mill, Freight and Shipbuilding Company (Rickmers Reismühlen Rhederei and Schiffbau A.G., more simply known as Rickmers A.G.) of Bremerhaven, Germany, for the company's Rickmers Line. She was the largest sailing ship in the world from 1907 to 1911, and the second German five-masted barque.

== Rickmers A.G. ==
Rickmers shipyard was founded by R. C. Rickmers in 1839. During the beginning of the 20th century the shipyard employed some 650 personnel and built several extraordinary large sailing vessels for its parent company's rice trade.

== The largest sailing vessel in the world ==
R. C. Rickmers was built in 1906 and was the largest ship in the world from 1907, when Thomas W. Lawson sunk and until 1911, when France II was launched. Her captain was August Walsen. She arrived at New York in the fall of 1906 on her maiden voyage from Bremen to Saigon and Bangkok around Cape Horn. Scientific American hosted a featured story about R. C. Rickmers in its October 1906 issue.

Under sail R. C. Rickmers was able to sail at about 13 to 14 knots, with a maximum speed of 17 knots. While using the steam engine she could have been driven at 8 knots without a load and 6 to 7 knots with a cargo.

== Voyages ==
In her first two and half years in trade she sailed 100,000 miles.

She completed multiple voyages around the world:

- East Asia (Singapore, Kobe and Hiogo, Japan, Saigon on her maiden voyage)
- Far East (Vladivostok)
- U.S. west coast (San Francisco, Los Angeles and Portland, Oregon)
- Australia (New South Wales) and to South America (Chile)

In 1912 and 1913 she made two major trips:

- Cardiff - Philadelphia - Cape of Good Hope - Kobe, Japan - Portland, Oregon - Antwerp
- Cardiff - Philadelphia - Cape of Good Hope - Japan - Vladivostok - Indian Ocean - Hull

Russian Tsar Nicholas II visited the ship during her stay in Vladivostok.

== Fate ==
At the onset of World War I, in August 1914, R. C. Rickmers was seized by the British Admiralty as a war prize at Cardiff. She was renamed Neath and placed on cargo trade.

On 27 March 1917, while under the British flag returning from Mauritius to Le Havre with a cargo of sugar, Neath was sunk by the German submarine U-66 off the coast of Ireland. All of her crew survived, with the ship's captain being taken prisoner by U-66.

== See also ==
- List of large sailing vessels

== Sources ==
- Monograph No. 34: Home Waters Part VIII: December 1916 to April 1917 (PDF). Naval Staff Monographs (Historical). Vol. XVIII. Naval Staff, Training and Staff Duties Division. 1933.
