= Windy (schooner) =

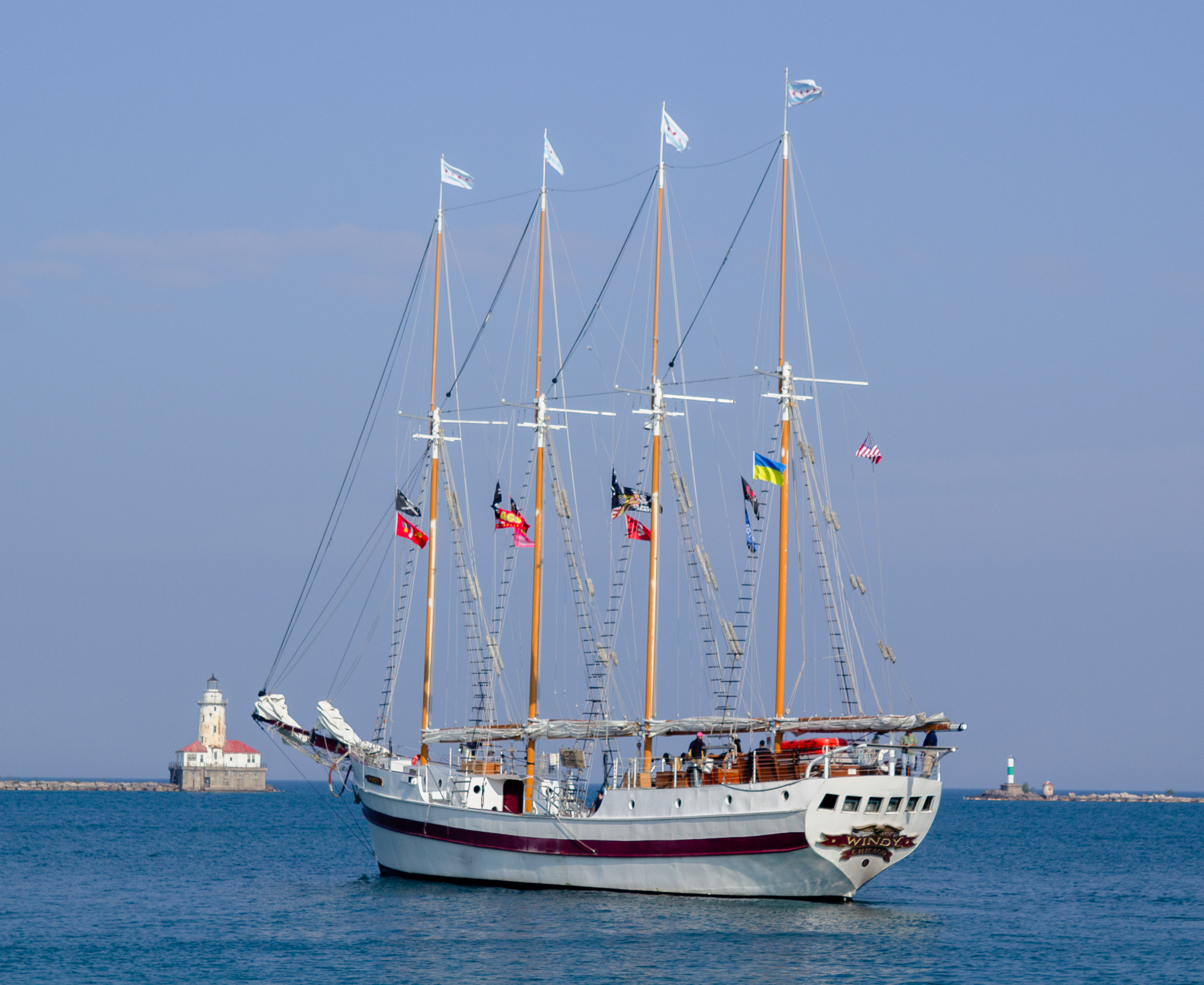
- The Windy departing from Navy Pier in downtown Chicago. The Chicago Harbor Light is visible behind it.

History

United States
- Name: Windy
- Owner: Tall Ship Windy
- Builder: Detyens Shipyard, Inc.
- Launched: 1996

General characteristics
- Length: 148 ft (45 m)
- Beam: 24 ft (7.3 m)
- Draft: 9.5 ft (2.9 m)
- Sail plan: Four-masted Schooner
- Windy (schooner)
- Location within Chicago metropolitan area
- Location: Navy Pier, Chicago, Illinois, USA
- Coordinates: 41°53′28″N 87°36′18″W
- Built: 1996

Windy is a four-masted schooner located in Chicago, Illinois, United States. She is moored at Navy Pier. She was built in 1996 in Charleston, South Carolina, and is owned and operated by Tall Ship Windy as a passenger tour boat. In 2004, Windy was designated the official tall ship of the City of Chicago by mayor Richard M. Daley. She is the only tall ship moored in Chicago.

== Use in performance ==
An image of the Windy was used in the 2008 film The Dark Knight on a prop newspaper depicting protagonist Bruce Wayne's private yacht, though the Windy's sister ship, the Windy II was ultimately used as the filming location for the scenes aboard the yacht.

In 2012, the Windy hosted a production of The Pirates of Penzance performed on the ship.

== Windy II ==
The Windy's sister ship, the Windy II, was launched in 2001. In 2011, it was renamed the Royal Albatross and moved to Singapore, where it serves as a luxury superyacht.

== See also ==
- List of schooners
