= Star Flyer =

Four-masted barquentine built in 1991

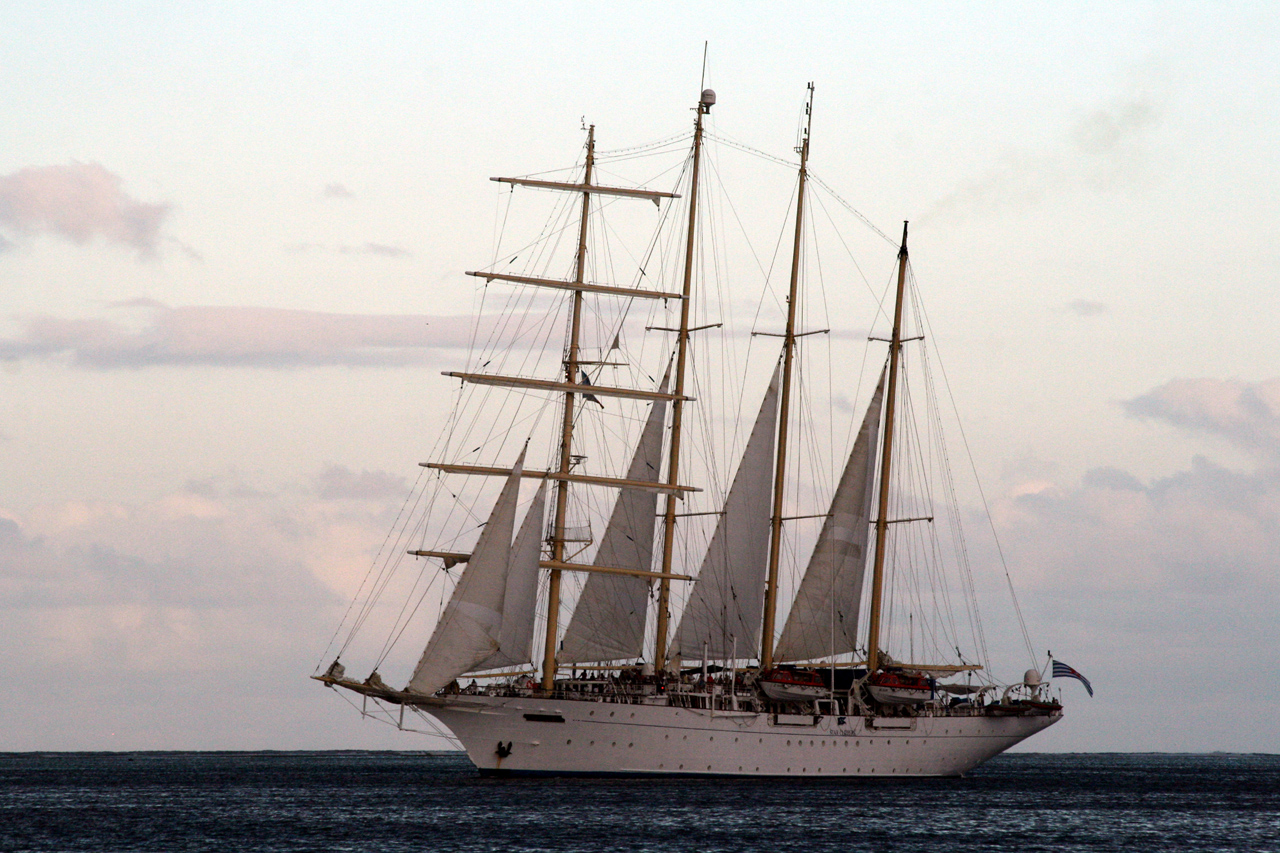

History
- Name: Star Flyer
- Owner: Star Clippers Ltd
- Operator: Star Clippers Ltd
- Port of registry: 1991–2010: Luxembourg, Luxembourg; 2010 onwards: Valletta, Malta
- Ordered: 18 August 1989
- Builder: Scheepswerven van Langerbrugge (Belgium)
- Yard number: 2183
- Laid down: 27 April 1990
- Launched: 4 January 1991
- Completed: 1 May 1991
- Identification: Call sign: 9HA2512; IMO number: 8915433; MMSI number: 248785000
- Status: In service

General characteristics
- Type: Barquentine, cruise ship
- Tonnage: 2,298 GT; 838 NT
- Length: 111.57 m (366 ft 1 in)
- Beam: 15.14 m (49 ft 8 in)
- Draught: 5.501 m (18 ft 0.6 in)
- Propulsion: 16 sails; Caterpillar 3512
- Capacity: 170 passengers; 300 tonnes deadweight (DWT)

Star Flyer is a four masted barquentine built as a cruise ship, and operated by Star Clippers Ltd of Sweden. A luxury vessel, Star Flyer is a sister ship to Star Clipper. Both sailed under the Luxembourg flag until 2010, and now sail under the Maltese flag.

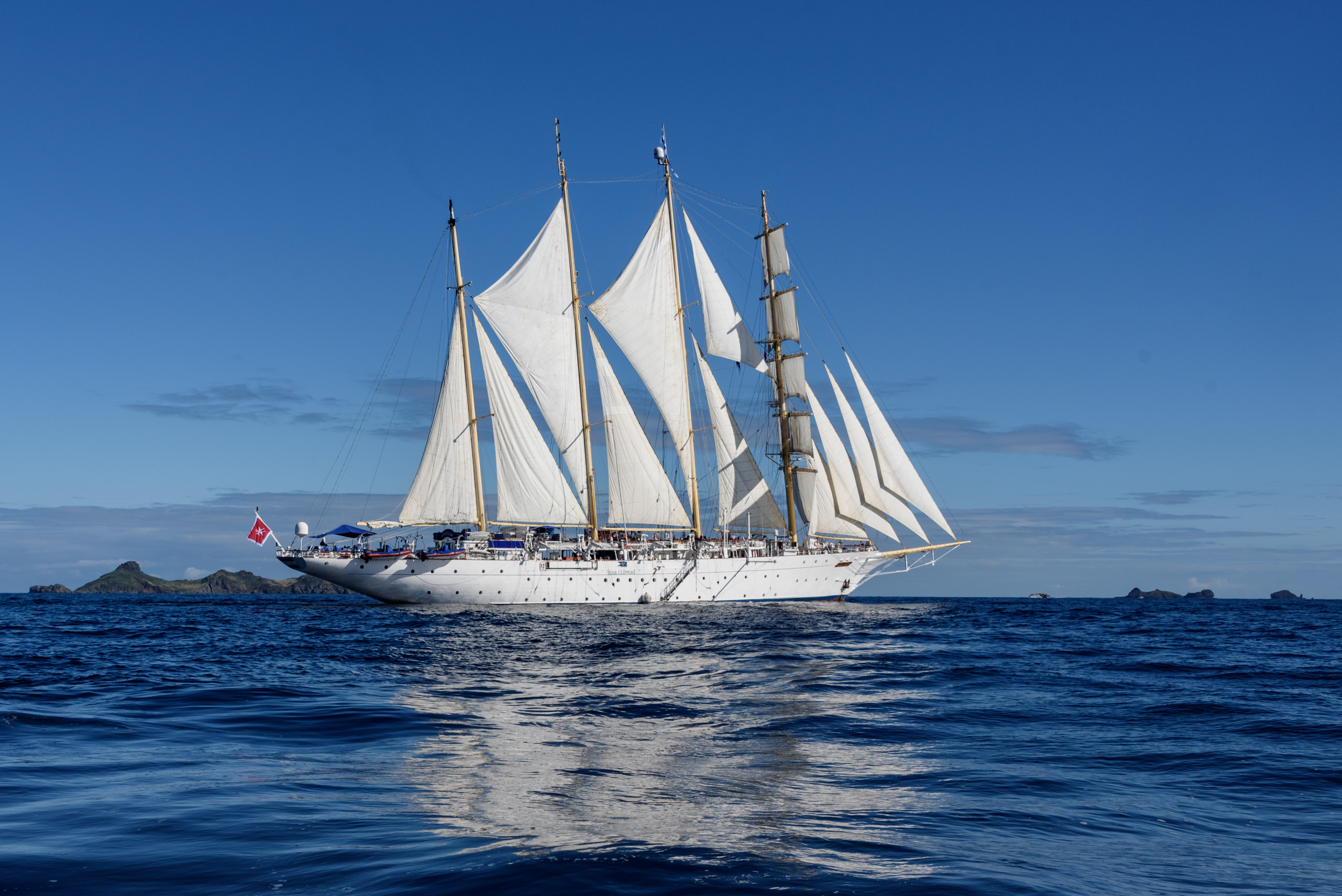
Four-masted barquentine, Star Flyer, off Saint Barthélemy in the Caribbean.

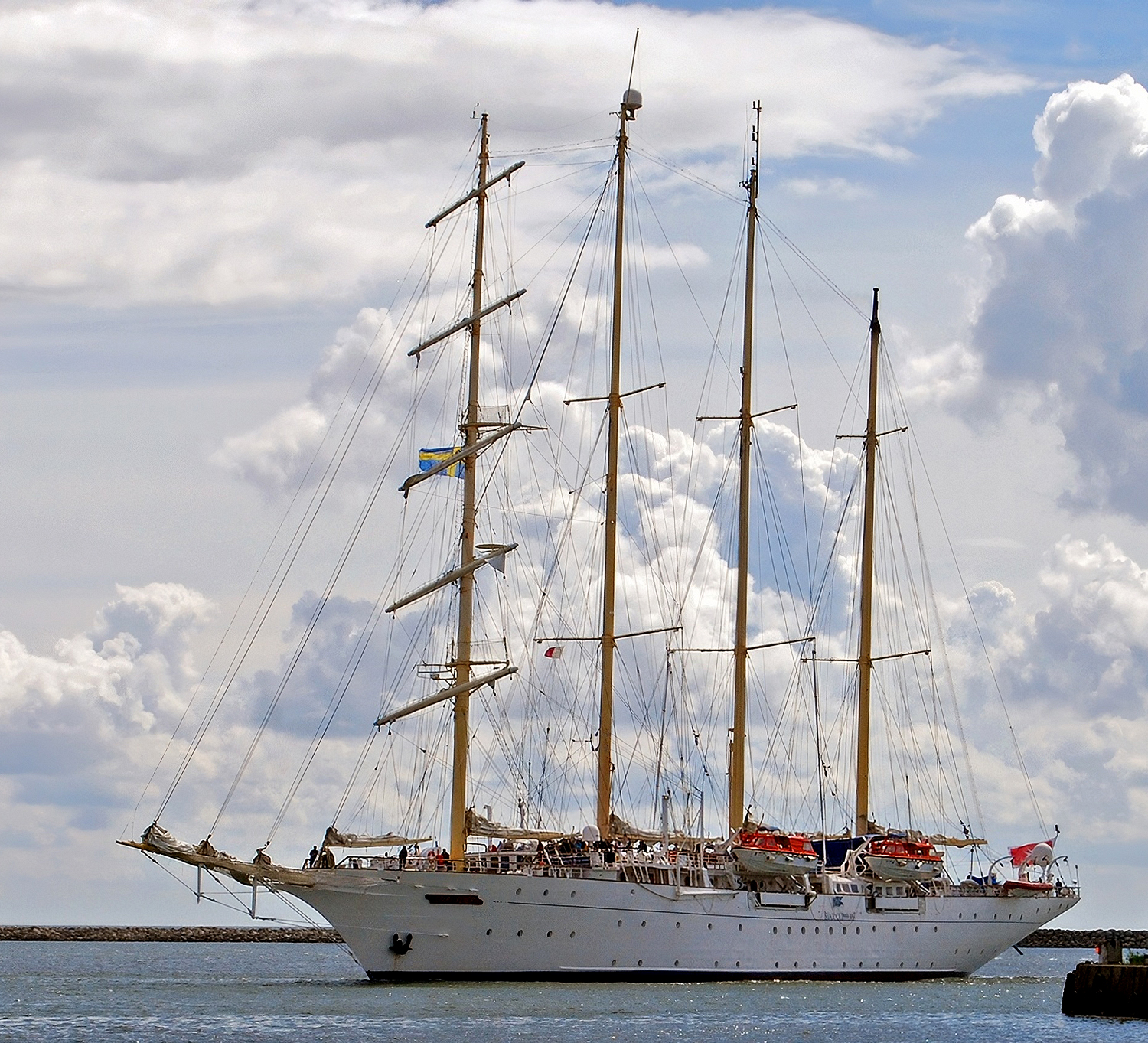
Star Flyer visiting Ystad August 12, 2013.

== See also ==
- Royal Clipper
- Star Clipper
- Flying Clipper
- Royal Albatross
- List of cruise ships
- List of large sailing vessels
