= Star Clipper =

Four masted barquentine built as a cruise ship

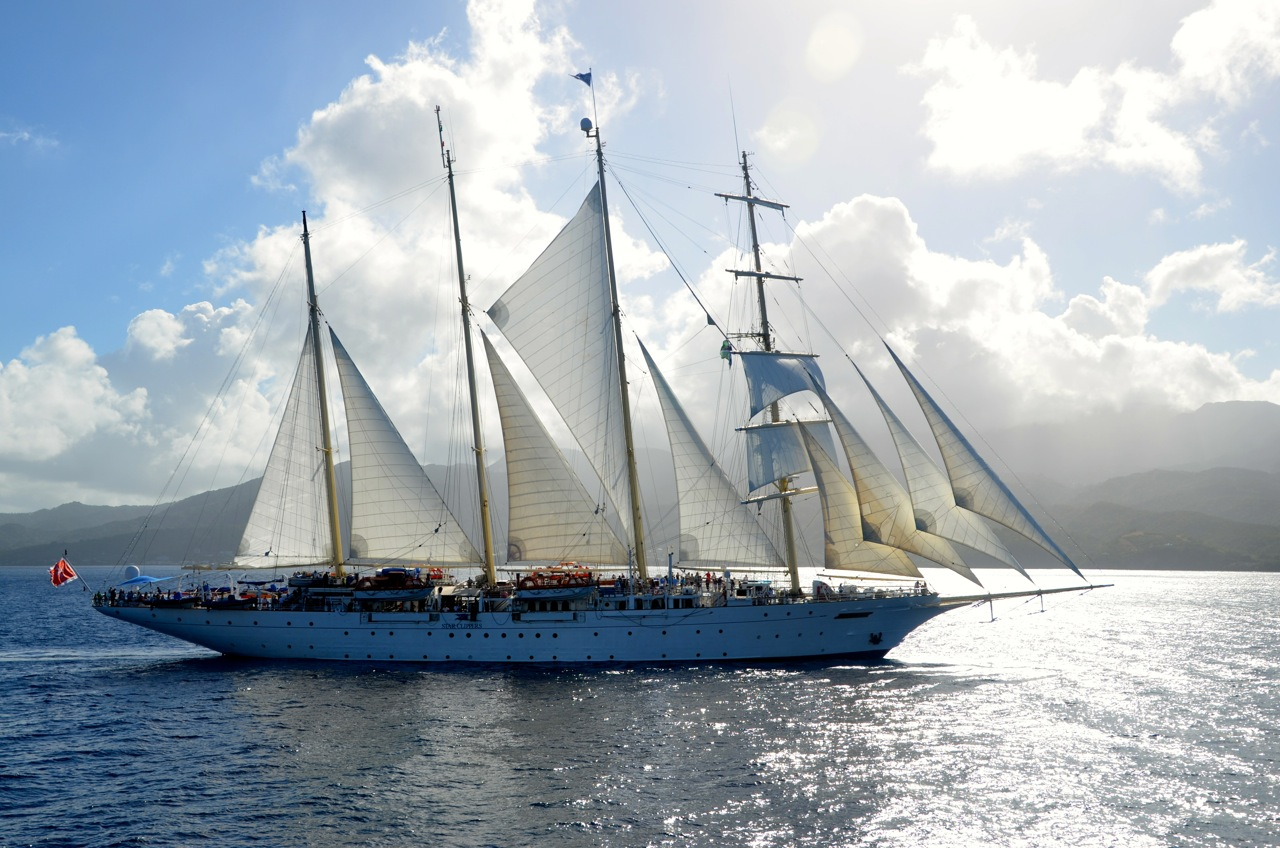

History
- Name: Star Clipper
- Owner: Star Clippers Ltd
- Operator: Star Clippers Ltd
- Port of registry: 1992–2010: Luxembourg, Luxembourg; 2010 onwards: Valletta, Malta
- Builder: Scheepswerven van Langerbrugge (Belgium)
- Yard number: 2184
- Laid down: 20 April 1990
- Completed: 1 April 1992
- Identification: Call sign: 9HA2513; IMO number: 8915445; MMSI number: 248786000; DNV ID: 21131
- Status: In service

General characteristics
- Type: Barquentine, cruise ship
- Tonnage: 2,298 GT; 838 NT
- Length: 111.57 m (366 ft 1 in)
- Beam: 15.14 m (49 ft 8 in)
- Draught: 4.7 m (15 ft 5 in)
- Propulsion: 6 sails; Caterpillar 3512 DITA
- Capacity: 170 passengers; 300 tonnes deadweight (DWT)

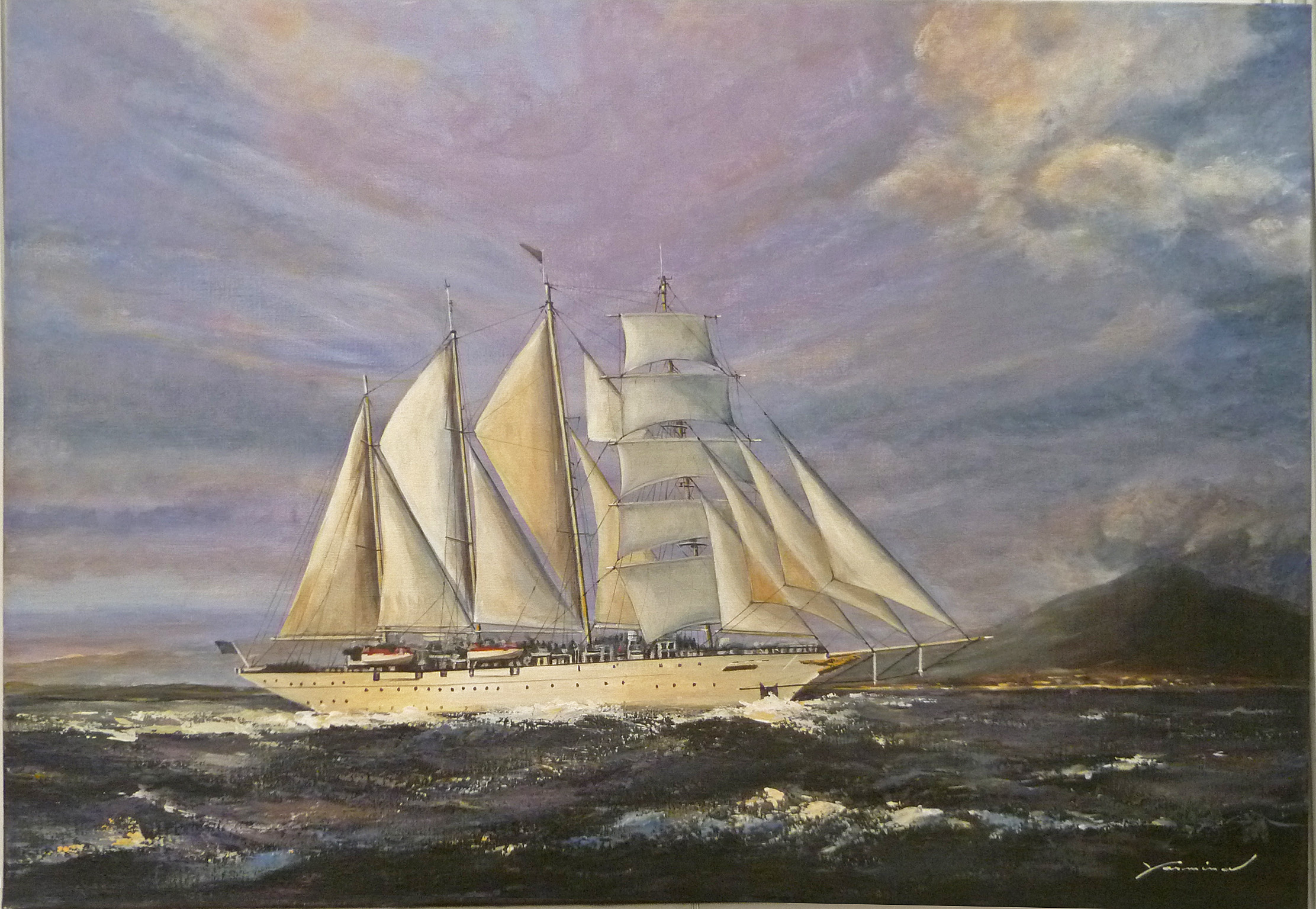
"Star Clipper", artistic impression by the Belgian artist Yasmina

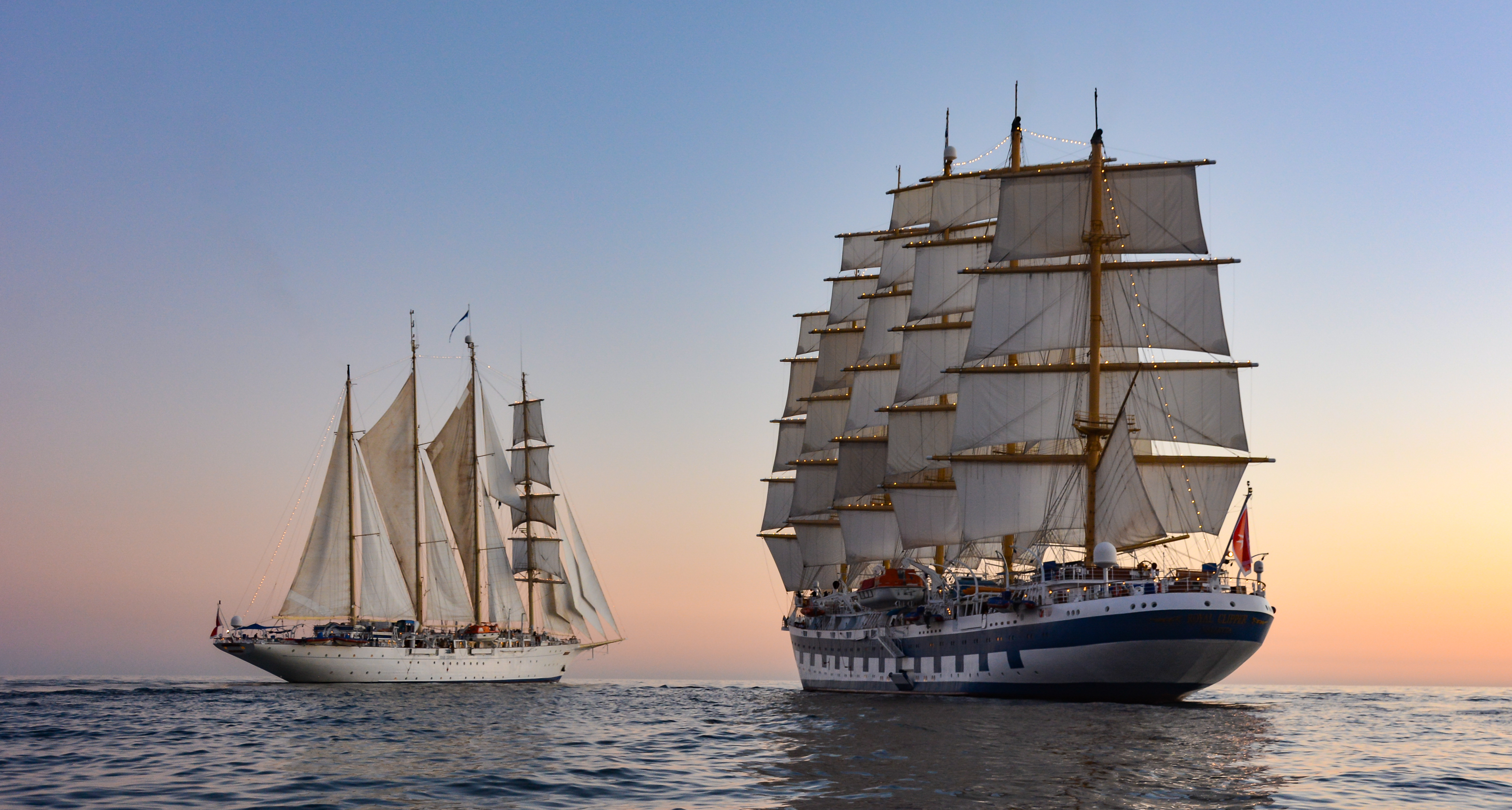
Star Clipper (left) and Royal Clipper (right)

Star Clipper is a four-masted barquentine built as a cruise ship, and operated by Star Clippers Ltd. She is the first clipper ship in this class since 1912. She is classed by DNV 100A1

A luxury vessel, she sails under the Maltese flag.

== See also ==
- Royal Clipper
- Star Flyer
- Flying Clipper
- List of cruise ships
- List of large sailing vessels
