= Royal Clipper =

Sail cruise ship, built 2000

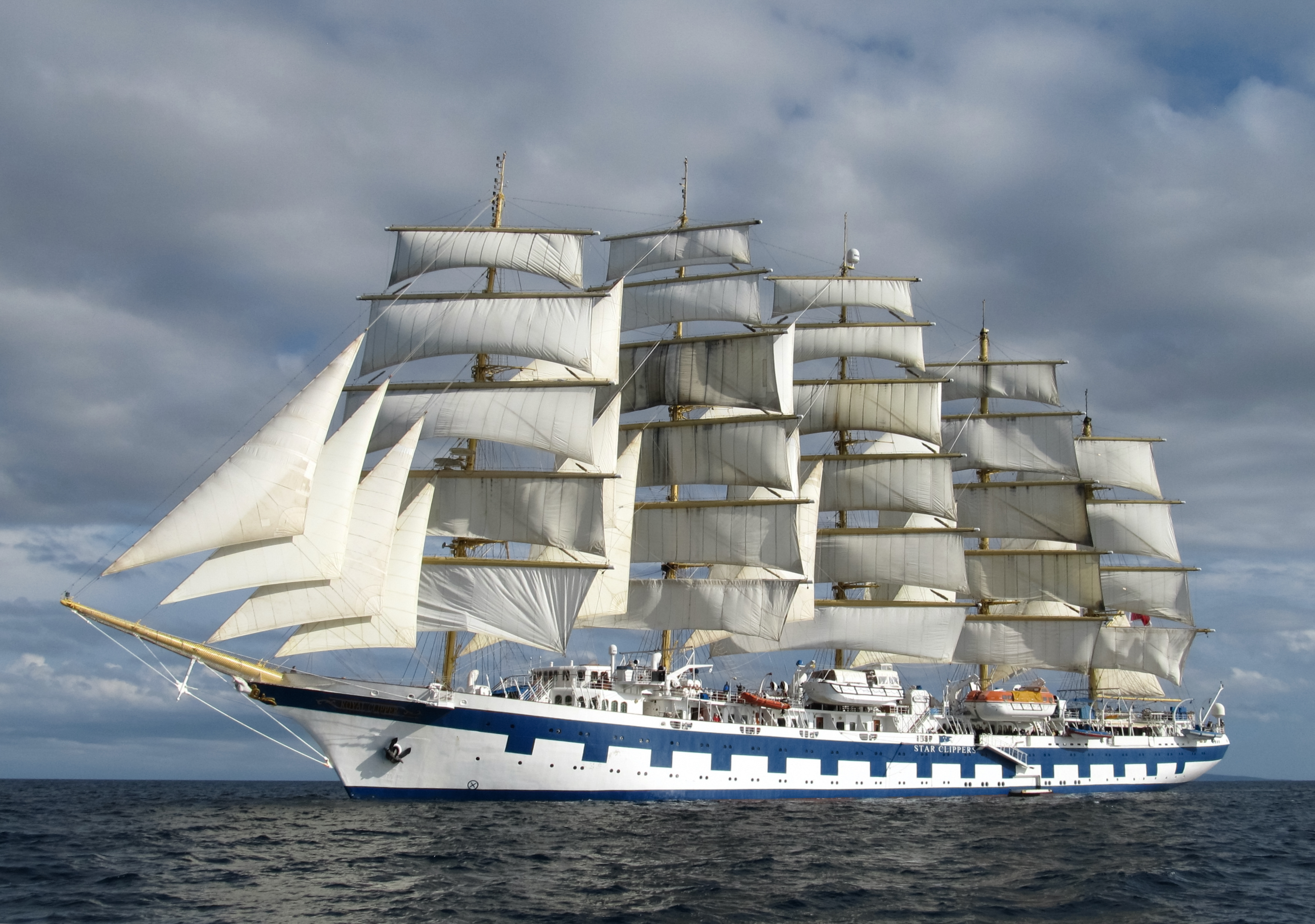

History

Malta
- Name: Royal Clipper
- Owner: Star Clippers
- Port of registry: Valletta
- Identification: IMO number: 8712178; MMSI number: 215813000; Callsign: 9HA2796
- Status: Active

General characteristics
- Type: Cruise ship
- Tonnage: 4,425 GT
- Length: 439 ft (134.8 m)
- Beam: 54 ft (16.5 m)
- Draft: 18.5 ft (5.6 m)
- Propulsion: Masts: 5; Sails: 42; Sail Area: 56,000 ft^{2} (5,202.6 m^{2}); Engines: 2 Caterpillar 3516 diesels
- Capacity: 227 passengers (Max)
- Crew: 106

Royal Clipper is a steel-hulled five-masted fully rigged tall ship used as a cruise ship. She was redesigned by Robert McFarlane of McFarlane ShipDesign, for Star Clippers Ltd. of Sweden, the same designer behind the cruise company's first two vessels Star Clipper and Star Flyer.

This third one was built using an existing steel hull designed by Zygmunt Choreń that was modified by the Gdańsk Shipyard, where 24 metres (79 ft) was added to its length. Originally built by Polish communist authorities as "Gwarek" she was intended as a floating vacation home for miners. This hull was sold because of financial problems. The Merwede shipyard completed the ship's interior in July 2000, whilst visiting the Pool of London, for its pre-launch to the travel industry. The renovations included frescography murals by Rainer Maria Latzke completing the ship's Mediterranean interior. Her design was based on Preussen, a famous German five-mast Flying P-Liner windjammer built in 1902.

Star Clippers claims that she is the largest "true sailing ship" built since Preussen. She is listed in Guinness World Records as the largest square-rigged ship in service, with 5,202 square metres (55,990 sq ft) of sail. Her sails can be handled with a crew as small as twenty using powered controls.

Royal Clipper cruises the Mediterranean during the summer. During the winter she offers Caribbean trips through the southern parts of the Lesser Antilles area. Because of her size, she can visit smaller ports that larger (motor) cruise ships can't reach. Transatlantic crossings are available between seasons.

== Gallery ==
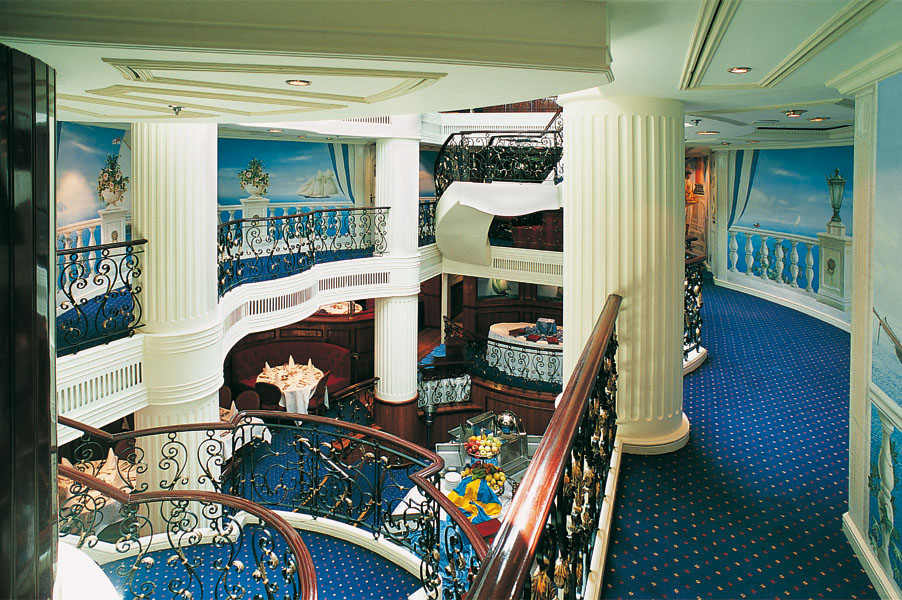
Lobby of Royal Clipper with murals from Rainer Maria Latzke

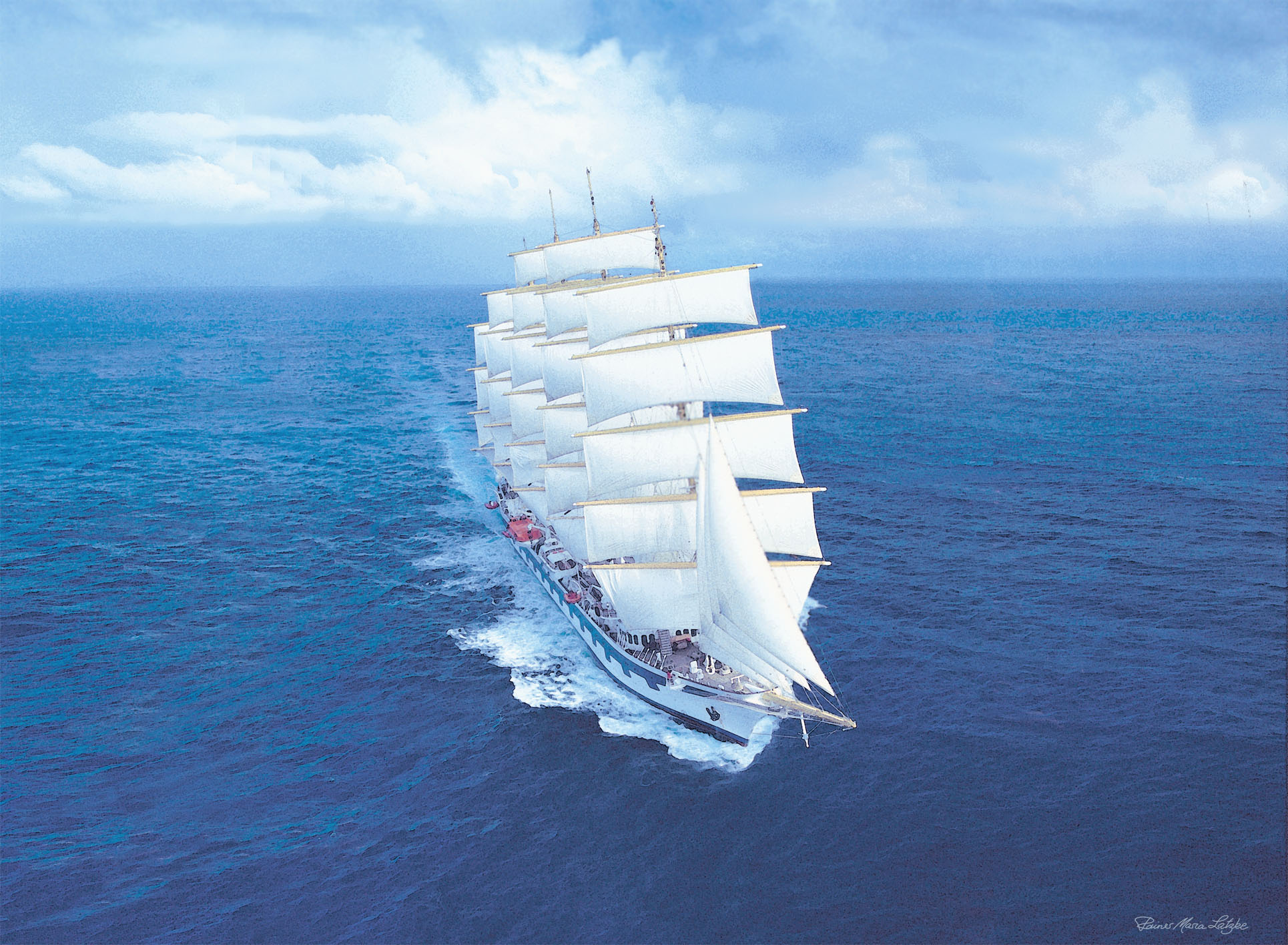
Royal Clipper (painting by Rainer Maria Latzke)

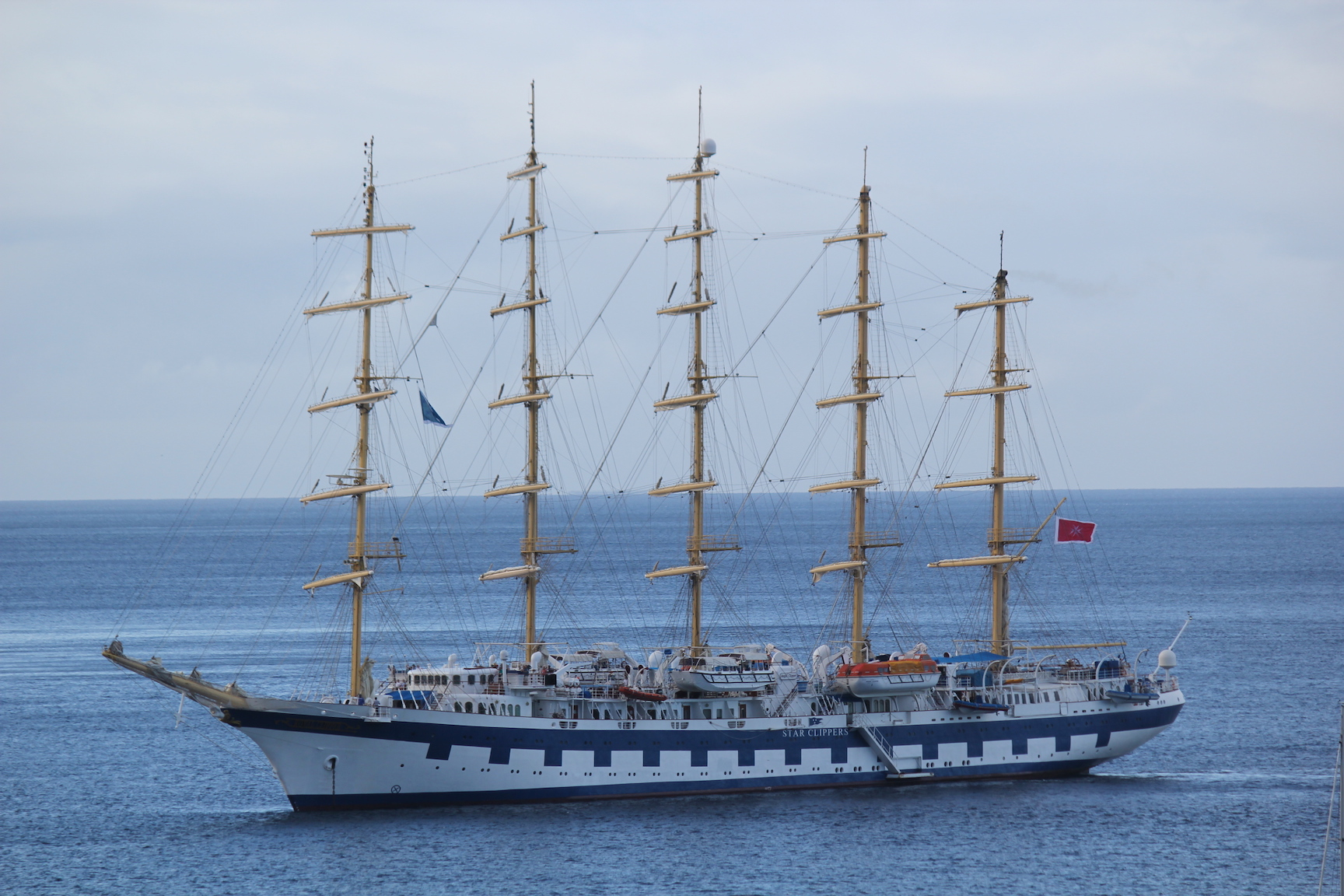
Royal Clipper anchored in Martinique (Caribbean Sea side) in March 2018.

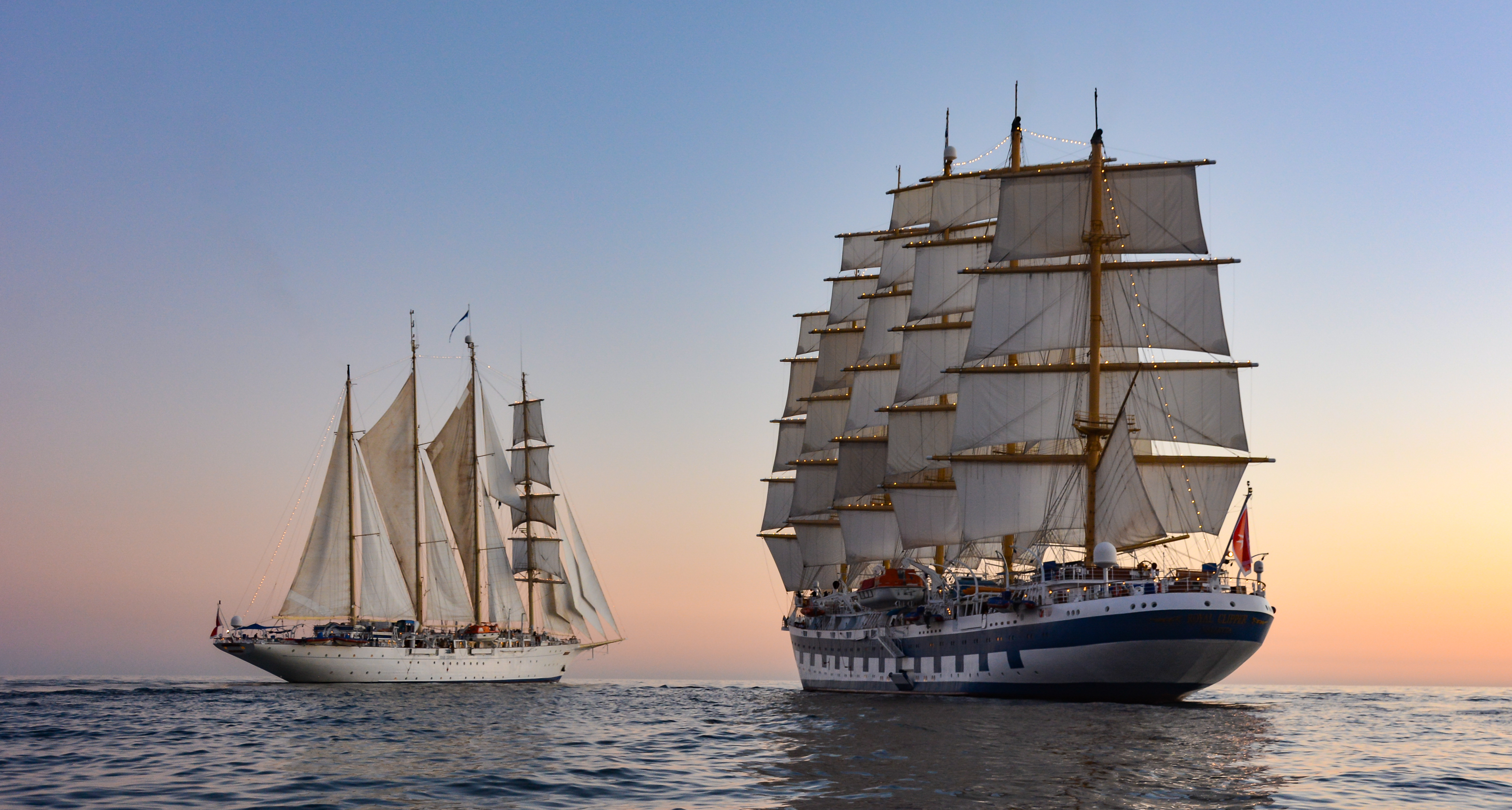
Royal Clipper (right) and Star Clipper (left)

== See also ==
- Star Clipper
- Star Flyer
- Flying Clipper
- List of cruise ships
- List of large sailing vessels
