= France II =

Ship

Coordinates: 21.8082°S 165.6467°E

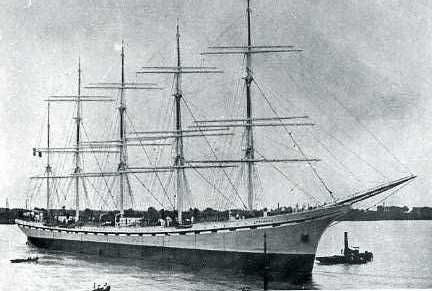
- France II at Bordeaux harbour in 1912 before her maiden voyage

History

France
- Name: France II
- Namesake: State of France
- Owner: Société Anonyme des Navires Mixtes (Prentout-Leblond), Leroux & Cie., Rouen
- Route: France-Australia-New Caledonia-USA
- Ordered: 1911
- Builder: Chantiers et Ateliers de la Gironde
- Laid down: March 1912
- Launched: November 9, 1912
- Completed: October 1913
- Maiden voyage: November 25, 1913 via Glasgow to Thio, New Caledonia with a cargo of coke
- Homeport: Rouen, France
- Identification: Code letters J H G T (French)
- Fate: Stranded on Teremba reef on July 12, 1922, no loss of men
- Badge: none; female figurehead representing the State of France

General characteristics
- Type: Five-masted steel barque; Nickel ore bulk carrier
- Tonnage: 5,633 GRT / 4,544 NRT
- Displacement: 10,710 ts (at 7,300 ts load)
- Length: 480.5 ft (146.5 m) (overall); 441.27 ft (134.50 m) (hull); 432.74 ft (131.90 m) (length on deck); 389.1 ft (118.6 m) (btw. perpendiculars)
- Beam: 55.65 ft (16.96 m)
- Height: 211.6 ft (64.5 m) (keel to masthead truck); 167.3 ft (51.0 m) (deck to masthead truck)
- Draft: 27.9 ft (8.5 m)
- Depth: 36.42 ft (11.10 m) (depth moulded)
- Depth of hold: 31.18 ft (9.50 m)
- Decks: 3 continuous steel, poop, midship, and forecastle decks
- Deck clearance: 8.2 ft (2.5 m)
- Propulsion: sail and auxiliary propulsion (2 Schneider diesel engines of 950 hp (710 kW), removed in 1919)
- Sail plan: 38 sails: 20 square sails, 12 staysails, 4 foresails, 2 spanker sails; 68.350 square feet (6.350 m^{2}) sail area
- Speed: 17.5 knots (32.4 km/h; 20.1 mph)
- Boats & landing craft carried: 4 lifeboats
- Complement: max. 45, since 1919: 50
- Crew: captain, 2nd captain, 1st, 2nd, & 3rd mates, steward, 39/44 able seamen and shipboys (including sailmaker, cook etc.)
- Armament: 2 cannon (bow and stern) during WWI
- Notes: lounge with piano, seven 1st class passenger cabins, library, darkroom, seawater therapy equipment

France II was a French sailing ship, built by Chantiers et Ateliers de la Gironde and launched in 1912. In hull length and overall size she was, after Preußen, the second largest commercial merchant sailing ship ever built. France II had the greatest cargo carrying capacity ever, 5,633 gross register tons (GRT) to the second-highest R. C. Rickmers at 5,548 GRT. An earlier sailing vessel named France had been built in 1890 by D. & W. Henderson & Son, Glasgow.

== Design ==
France II was an extremely large tall ship, square rigged as a five-masted steel-hulled barque. She was 146.5 metres (480 ft 8 in) long, her displacement was 10,710 metric tons (10,540 long tons; 11,810 short tons), and was measured at 5,633 gross register tons (GRT) of cargo. Her masts, yards and spanker boom were made of steel tubing; lower mast and topmast were made in one piece. She had a huge sail area of 6,350 m^{2} (68,400 sq ft), flown on a so-called "jubilee" or "bald-headed" rig, with no royal sails above double topsails and double topgallants. Her long yards and comparatively short masts gave her a rather wide and depressed appearance relative to other tall ships of her class.

Wood was used for her deck and furnishings. She was fitted with a beautiful lounge equipped with a piano and precious furniture, seven luxury passenger cabins, a library, a darkroom, and seawater therapy equipment.

Her "three-island" deck-line was striking, with an extremely long poop deck similar to sail training ships, forecastle, and midship island, leaving only two short open upper deck sections, each containing one of her huge loading hatches.

== History ==
France II was built in 1911 at the yards of Chantiers et Ateliers de la Gironde on the banks of the river Garonne in Bordeaux to the plans of chief designer Gustave Leverne (1861–1940). She was intended for the nickel ore trade and owned by the Société Anonyme des Navires Mixtes (Prentout-Leblond, Leroux & Cie.). At that time she had the largest cargo capacity of any sailing ship ever built.

The huge barque was equipped with two Schneider 950 horsepower (710 kW) diesel engines, which were removed in 1919. Her crew consisted of 5 officers: captain, 2nd captain (on French ships only (second capitaine); a naval officer of a captain's rank as a vice-captain and security officer, see chief mate), 1st, 2nd, and 3rd mates and 40 able seamen including cook, steward, sailmaker, ship's carpenter, which was increased to 45 in 1919.

In 1915 she was sold to Leroux-Henzey of Rouen, and sold again in 1916 to the Compagnie Française de Marine et de Commerce (French Company of Marine and Trade) also of Rouen, her port of registry remained the same.

On a homeward passage in 1922 with a cargo of chrome ore from Pouembout, New Caledonia, she went aground on the night of July 12, 1922 on the Teremba reef (Urai bay) northwest of the Ouano reef, nearly 60 nautical miles (110 km; 69 mi) northwest of Nouméa. Because of fallen cargo rates her owner refused to pay for a tugboat to tow her free, and she was abandoned. In 1944, American bombers bombed the wreckage for target practice.

In 1995 planning started to raise funds to design and build a replica of France II, but by 2010 very little progress had been made.

Tall-ship cruise line Star Clippers launched a new ship based on France II named Flying Clipper on 10 June 2017.

== See also ==
- List of large sailing vessels

== Bibliography ==
- Roger et Christian Bernadat: "France(II), le plus grand voilier du monde, construit à Bordeaux". Les Editions de l'Entre-deux-Mers, Saint-Quentin-de-Baron 2008 ; ISBN 978-2-913568-59-4
- Jochen Brennecke: Windjammer. Der große Bericht über die Entwicklung, Reisen und Schicksale der "Königinnen der Sieben Meere". Koehlers Verlagsgesellschaft, Herford 1984; Kap. XXII – Die Größten unter den Segelschiffen der Welt, pp 299; ISBN 3-7822-0009-8
- Hans-Jörg Furrer: Die Vier- und Fünfmast-Rahsegler der Welt. Koehlers Verlagsgesellschaft, Herford 1984, pp 93; ISBN 3-7822-0341-0
- Jean Randier: Grands voiliers français 1880–1930. Construction, gréement, manoeuvre, vie à bord. Editions des Quatre Seigneurs, Grenoble 1974; ISBN 2-85231-012-0
