= Golden Horizon =

Sail cruise ship completed in 2021

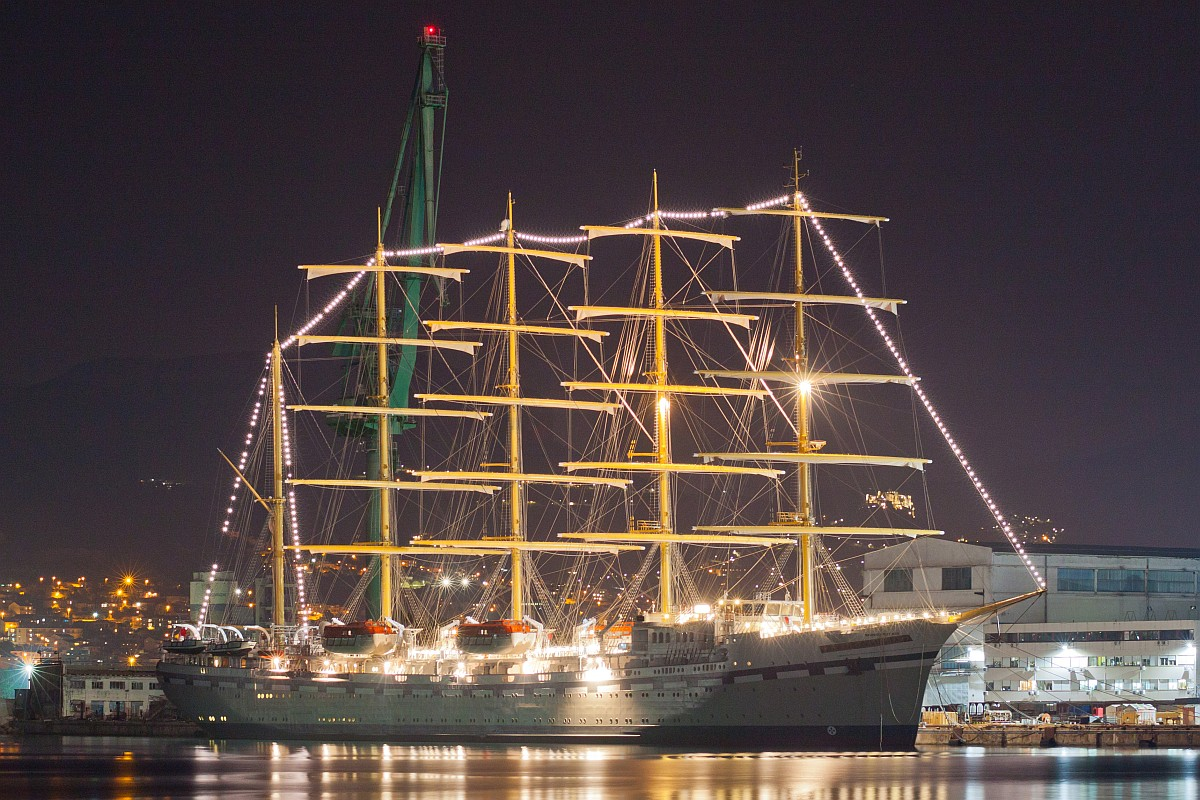

History

Croatia
- Name: Golden Horizon
- Owner: Brodosplit
- Operator: out of service
- Port of registry: Split, Croatia
- Ordered: 2 December 2014
- Builder: Brodosplit
- Yard number: 483
- Laid down: 9 December 2015
- Launched: 10 June 2017
- Completed: 9 June 2021
- Maiden voyage: 2021
- Identification: Call sign: 9A6701; IMO number: 9793545; MMSI number: 238021000
- Status: Laid up

General characteristics
- Type: Cruise ship
- Tonnage: 8,770 GT
- Length: 162.22 m
- Beam: 18.5 m
- Propulsion: Masts: 5; Sails: 36; Sail Area: (6347 m²); Engines: 2 electric
- Speed: 16 knots (20 max)
- Capacity: 272 passengers
- Crew: 159

SV Golden Horizon is a steel-hulled five-masted barque rigged tall ship which is intended to serve as a cruise ship, but has almost never seen active service. Originally named Flying Clipper, the luxury vessel was designed by Polish naval architect Zygmunt Choreń, for Star Clippers Ltd. of Sweden, and built by the Brodosplit Shipyard in Split, Croatia. She is the largest sailing ship ever launched. Her design was based on France II, a famous French five-mast cargo windjammer built in 1911.

Due to a dispute with the shipyard, she was never delivered to Star Clippers. Instead, she has been chartered by Tradewind Voyages and renamed Golden Horizon.

She entered into operation in May 2021. However the vessel was seized by UK authorities on the morning of the inaugural cruise over an ongoing financial dispute with Star Clippers.

Following withdrawal of finances by the Croatian owner of Golden Horizon, the Company 'Tradewind Voyages' has ceased trading. The vessel languishes in Split with a threat of sale to raise funds following bankruptcy proceedings of the Owner's Croatian Company.

== See also ==
- Royal Clipper
- Star Clipper
- Star Flyer
- List of cruise ships
- List of large sailing vessels
