= Senator Cisneros =

Senator Cisneros may refer to:

== Cuba (defunct Senate of the Republic) ==
- Salvador Cisneros Betancourt (1828–1914)

== Mexico (Senate of the Republic) ==
- Joaquín Cisneros Fernández (born 1941)

== United States ==
- Carlos Cisneros (1948–2019), New Mexico Senate
- Roger Cisneros (1924–2017), Colorado State Senate
