= Hugo de Burgh =

British academic (born 1949)

Hugo de Burgh (born 10 June 1949) is the founder of the China Media Centre at the University of Westminster. He previously directed the Centre for Media Research at Goldsmiths' College. De Burgh is a State Administration of Foreign Experts Affairs Endowment Professor at Tsinghua University, an honorary fellow at the 48 Group Club, and a board member at the Great Britain–China Centre. De Burgh is a member of the Social Democratic Party and was a candidate for the party in the 2024 United Kingdom general election.

== Background ==
Burgh began his academic career teaching history at Edinburgh University before working as an education correspondent and television producer for STV, BBC, and Channel 4. In 2004, he became a professor of journalism at the University of Westminster, where he established the China Media Centre.

=== Thesis ===
De Burgh's research has focused on the social function of journalism as a reflection of culture. He has stated, "It is often said that journalism is the first rough draft of history; by contrast, investigative journalism provides the first rough draft of legislation..."

In 2020, in China’s Media in the Emerging World Order, he posited that "the way the Chinese media work can be understood as a reflection of culture as much as of political economy."

=== Chinese journalism ===
De Burgh has expressed particular interest in the reappearance of investigative journalism in Chinese since 1992, stating that this demonstrated that investigative journalism techniques apply in contrasting political cultures.

It was a surprise to Western observers to find that the Chinese media (and investigative journalists in particular) are, despite limitations upon them, influencing public life today by introducing new and unconventional ideas, changing terms of reference, forcing the pace of reform, giving voice to concerns and calling attention to issues.
