= 2012 Colorado elections =

A general election was held in the U.S. state of Colorado on November 6, 2012. In addition to the presidential race, several statewide and federal offices were up for election. State primaries were held on June 26, 2012, while the Republican and Democratic presidential caucuses took place on February 7 and March 6 respectively.

== Federal offices ==
=== President of the United States ===
Incumbent president Barack Obama won the state of Colorado and its nine electoral votes by defeating Republican nominee Mitt Romney by 5 percentage points.

=== House of Representatives ===
All seven seats from Colorado in the United States House of Representatives were up for election. Republicans maintained their 4-3 lead; no seat changed partisan control.

== State Board of Education ==
Two seats on the Colorado State Board of Education were up for election in 2012.

District	Party	Incumbent	Status	Party	Candidate	Votes	%
2	Democratic	Angelika Schroeder	running	Democratic	Angelika Schroeder	221,264	55.06%
2	Democratic	Angelika Schroeder	running	Republican	Ann Fattor	155,377	38.67%
2	Democratic	Angelika Schroeder	running	Libertarian	David Cottrell	25,196	6.27%
4	Republican	Bob Schaffer	not running	Republican	Pam Mazanec	218,988	72.16%
4	Republican	Bob Schaffer	not running	Libertarian	Steven Ray Delinger	84,489	27.84%

Source: Colorado Secretary of State

== CU Board of Regents ==
Four seats in the University of Colorado Board of Regents were up for election in 2012.

District	Party	Incumbent	Status	Party	Candidate	Votes	%
3	Republican	Tillie Bishop	not running	Republican	Glen Gallegos	170,371	53.15%
3	Republican	Tillie Bishop	not running	Democratic	Jessica Garrow	150,186	46.85%
5	Republican	Kyle Hybl	running	Republican	Kyle Hybl	196,448	70.17%
5	Republican	Kyle Hybl	running	Libertarian	Steven Hartmann	47,045	16.80%
5	Republican	Kyle Hybl	running	Constitution	Gina Biolchini	36,478	13.03%
7 (special)	Democratic	Irene Griego	running (Note: Appointed by Governor John Hickenlooper in November 2011.)	Democratic	Irene Griego	161,706	51.97%
7 (special)	Democratic	Irene Griego	running	Republican	Mary Dambman	125,326	40.28%
7 (special)	Democratic	Irene Griego	running	Libertarian	Eric Robinson	24,097	7.75%

Source: Colorado Secretary of State

=== At-large seat ===
Incumbent Democrat Stephen Ludwig ran for re-election.

==== Democratic nominee ====
- Stephen Ludwig, incumbent regent

==== Republican primary ====
===== Candidates =====
- Brian Davidson, anesthesiologist
- Matt Arnold, activist and former Army Reserve captain

===== Primary results =====
Republican primary results
Party	Candidate	Votes	%
Republican	Brian Davidson	156,658	61.25%
Republican	Matt Arnold	99,111	38.75%
Total votes		255,769	100%

==== Third party candidates ====
- Daniel Ong (Libertarian), technician
- Tyler Belmont (Constitution), student

==== General election ====
Results by county Ludwig: 40–50%; 50–60%; 60–70%; Davidson: 40–50%; 50–60%; 60–70%; 70–80%

2012 University of Colorado Board of Regents at-large election
Party	Candidate	Votes	%
Democratic	Stephen Ludwig (incumbent)	1,092,164	47.42%
Republican	Brian Davidson	1,023,658	44.44%
Libertarian	Daniel Ong	122,651	5.33%
Constitution	Tyler Belmont	64,814	2.81%
Total votes		2,303,287	100%
