= Westminster Business School =

Business school of the University of Westminster

Coordinates: 51.5220°N 0.1549°W

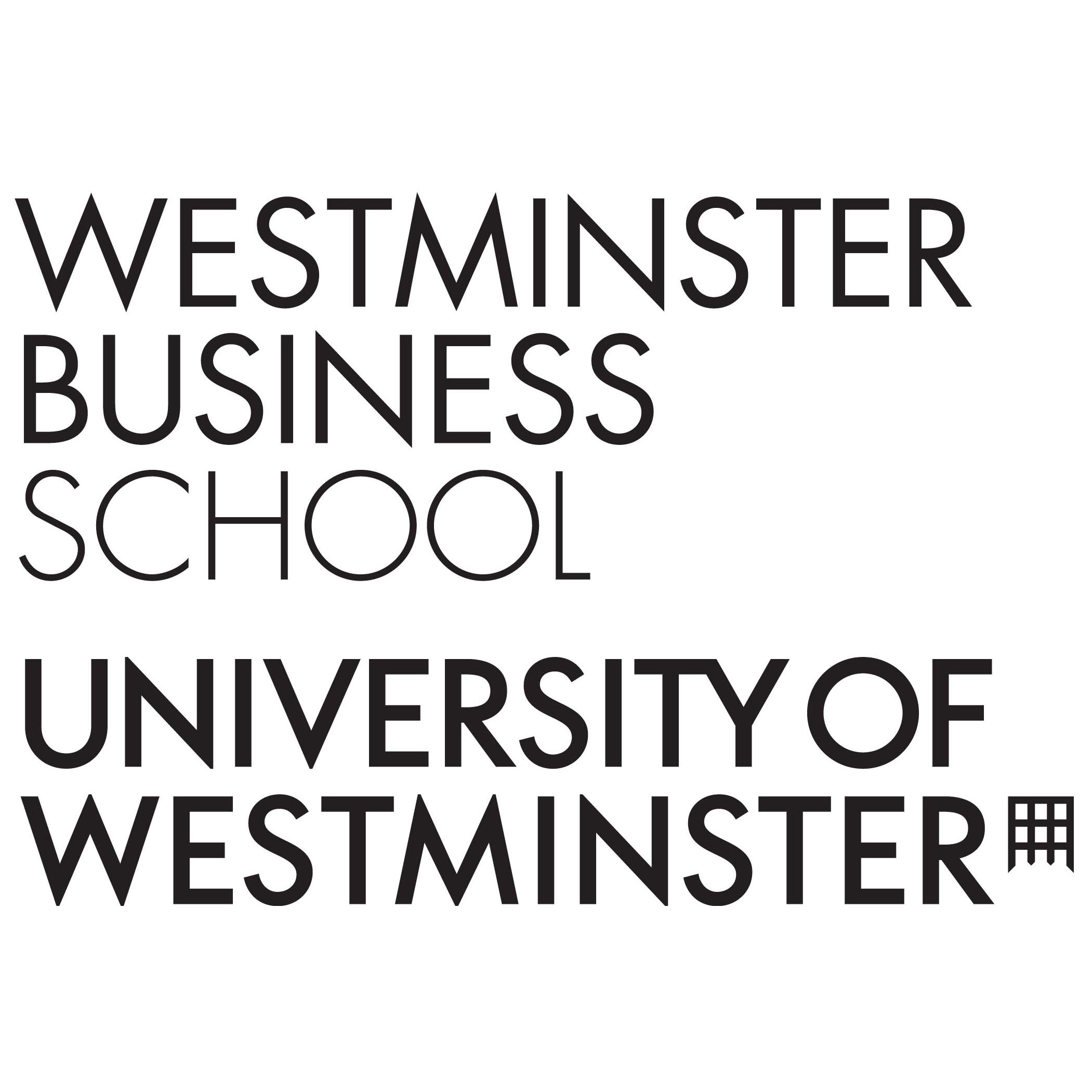
- Affiliations: AMBA and AACSB
- Dean: Professor Christos Kalantaridis
- Location: London, England, UK
- Campus: Urban
- Website: www.westminster.ac.uk/wbs

Westminster Business School is the business school of the University of Westminster. Located at its Marylebone campus in central London, it is one of the capital's leading centres for business education and has a large and diverse staff base with extensive business, consultancy and research achievements.

The school is divided into four faculties: School of Applied Management, School of Finance and Accounting, School of Management and Marketing and the School of Organisations, Economy and Society.

It awards BSc (Hons), MSc, MBA and PhD degrees and is one of under 70 schools globally to be accredited by Association of MBAs in the United Kingdom, and the AACSB in the United States.

== History ==
The University has been delivering management programmes since its antecedent institute, the Royal Polytechnic Institution, was founded in 1838. Westminster Business School was established in 1971, and its MBA programme gained accreditation by the Association of MBAs in 1987.

== Accreditations and rankings ==
Westminster Business School has received accreditations from professional bodies such as the Association of Chartered Certified Accountants, APM, CFA Society of the UK, Chartered Institute of Marketing, The Chartered Institute of Management Accountants, The Chartered Institute of Personnel and Development accreditation, Chartered Institute of Public Finance, Chartered Management Institute, PMI, The Management Development Network, and the Institute of Chartered Accountants in England and Wales.

Westminster Business School was ranked 73 in The Complete University Guide list of top business schools in 2020.
