= China Media Centre =

China-funded media consultancy in the UK

- Formation: 2005; 21 years ago
- Founders: Jeremy Paxman, Sun Yusheng
- Type: consultancy organization
- Purpose: study the world's largest media system
- Services: scholarships, fee-waivers, conferences, seminars
- Website: chinamediacentre.org

The China Media Centre was launched in 2005 by Jeremy Paxman and Sun Yusheng, vice-president of state-owned China Central Television (CCTV). It was set up within the University of Westminster's Culture and Media Research Institute (CAMRI).

China Media Centre is led by Hugo de Burgh, Professor of Journalism in the Communications and Media Research Institute of the University of Westminster. He is State Administration of Foreign Experts Affairs Endowment Professor at Tsinghua University, honorary fellow at the 48 Group Club, and board member at the Great Britain–China Centre.
