= Martin Hatcher =

American politician and college professor

E Martin Hatcher

Member of the Colorado Senate from the 33rd district
- In office January 14, 1975 – January 5, 1983
- Preceded by: Al C. Ruland
- Succeeded by: Regis Groff

Personal details
- Born: E Martin Hatcher; September 19, 1927 Ada, Oklahoma
- Died: December 27, 2023 (aged 96) Gunnison, Colorado
- Party: Democratic
- Spouse: Maxine Hatcher (née Millikin)
- Children: Three sons
- Education: University of Denver
- Profession: Professor of speech and drama

E Martin Hatcher (September 19, 1927 – December 27, 2023) was a college professor and Democratic state senator from Colorado, U.S. He served two terms in the state senate, from 1975 to 1983. Born in Ada, Oklahoma, he moved with his family to Denver as a child, then after finishing college he moved to Gunnison, Colorado and began teaching at Western State College (now Western Colorado University), where he taught for 44 years.

== Elections ==
Hatcher first ran for the state senate in 1974. He ran unopposed in the Democratic primary. In the general election, he initially faced long-term incumbent Republican Harry M. Locke, who had served in the state senate since 1951. However, Locke died in October 1974, a month after winning the Republican primary. A Republican vacancy committee appointed John B. Shawcroft to replace Locke, but the general election ballots had already been printed, forcing Shawcroft to wage a write-in campaign. Hatcher won handily. He was re-elected in 1978.

== Senate leadership position ==
Hatcher served as the Senate Minority Caucus Chair from 1981 to 1982.

== Personal life and death ==
Hatcher's official first name is simply the letter E, without a period. To friends and family, he was known as Marty. He married Maxine Millikin, who predeceased him, in 1948. He held a bachelor's, a master's, and a doctoral degree from the University of Denver. During World War II, he served in the U.S. Army as a cryptographic technician in Fairbanks, Alaska and was honorably discharged in 1946. He died on December 27, 2023, in Gunnison.
