= Roger Cisneros =

American politician

Member of the Colorado Senate from the 4th district
- In office January 8, 1969 – January 12, 1977
- Preceded by: Richard F. Hobbs
- Succeeded by: Don Sandoval

Member of the Colorado Senate from the 1st district
- In office January 11, 1967 – January 8, 1969
- Preceded by: Roland L. Mapelli
- Succeeded by: Allen Dines

Member of the Colorado Senate from the 6th district
- In office January 13, 1965 – January 11, 1967
- Preceded by: Harry M. Locke
- Succeeded by: William L. Armstrong

Personal details
- Born: January 22, 1924 Questa, New Mexico
- Died: September 18, 2017 (aged 93) Denver, Colorado
- Party: Democratic

Roger Cisneros (January 22, 1924 – September 18, 2017) was an American politician who served in the Colorado Senate from 1965 to 1977.

== Background ==
Cisneros was born on January 22, 1924, in Questa, New Mexico to Donaciano Cisneros and Todosia Martinez. Since his lived in a rural environment, Cisneros' parents sent him to school in Albuquerque to hone his academic talents. Upon graduating high school in 1943, Cisneros joined the Army Air Corps in 1943, and was assigned to the 333rd Bombardment Group after completing his training in cryptography.

== Career ==
Following his Army service, Cisneros pursued higher education with the aid of the GI Bill. He first earned his business degree from the University of Denver, and then graduated from the Westminster Law School in 1957. Cisneros wanted to become a lawyer due to the racial discrimination that he endured while serving in the military.

When he was admitted to practice law, Cisneros was one of only five Latino lawyers in Colorado. He was counsel in the case Gallegos vs. People, which pertained to an involuntary confession by a juvenile. When the Colorado Supreme Court affirmed the defendants' convictions, Cisneros appealed to the U.S. Supreme Court. The higher court reversed the lower court's decision.

In 1964, Cisneros was elected to the Colorado State Senate and served two sessions. In 1978, he was appointed by Governor Richard Lamm to serve as a judge that specialized in domestic, criminal, and civil cases on the Colorado District Court. Although Cisneros retired from the bench in 1986, he resumed private practice. Throughout his career, Cisneros served on various boards and commissions, and was even the founder of the Board of the Mexican American Legal Defense.

== Personal life and legacy ==
Cisneros married Adelia Dee Trujillo on March 19, 1949, and they had three children. He and Adelia died of carbon monoxide poisoning on September 18, 2017, in Denver, Colorado at age 93. In 2009, a jury room inside the Denver Justice Center was named after Cisneros.
