= Tom Ang =

New Zealand photographer and author

- Occupations: Photographer; Author; Academic

Tom Ang is a Singaporean photographer, author, traveller, and academic based in New Zealand.

== Career ==
=== Academic career ===
Ang was a senior lecturer in photographic practice at the University of Westminster from 1991 to 2004, teaching the undergraduate photography programmes, as well as the Masters in Journalism Studies. He also created the MA Photographic Journalism course.

Ang led a Know How Fund project (within the REAP (Regional Academic Partnership) scheme) that helped equip a radio studio for radio students and reformed the journalism curriculum for the Kyrgyz Russian Slavonic University in Bishkek, Kyrgyzstan.

=== Photography career ===
In 1979, Ang was a founding member of Wandsworth Photo Co-op, which grew into Photofusion, London's largest independent photography resource. Ang was also a founding member of the World Photographic Academy and helped set up the Student Focus element of the Sony World Photography Awards. He juried for the Czech Press Photo in 2009, the Hamdan International Photography Award and Wildlife Photographer of the Year.

A specialist in travel and digital photography, he has photographed extensively in Central Asia. For over 10 years, he specialized in photographing Central Asia, extensively travelling in Uzbekistan and Kyrgyzstan, with a few visits to Kazakhstan and Tajikistan.

Ang was the presenter of the BBC series "A Digital Picture of Britain", first transmitted in 2005 on BBC4. A second series, entitled "Britain in Pictures" was transmitted in 2007. He presented an 8-part TV series for Channel News Asia in Singapore, which was broadcast in August 2009 (Bronze World Medal, Educational / Instructional, New York Television and Film Awards, 2010).

He had written 35 books on photography.

He is also a Sony New Zealand digital imaging ambassador.

== Awards ==
Ang won the Thomas Cook Travel Book Award for Best Illustrated Travel Book. He won the HIPA Content Producer Award 2019 Hamdan International Photography Award 2019.

== Selected bibliography ==
- Photography: A Visual Companion (DK Ultimate Guides) 2023 ISBN 978-0241635087
- Photography: The Definitive Visual History (DK Definitive Cultural Histories) 2022 ISBN 978-0241515877
- Photography Judging: for photographers photojudges picture editors 2021 ISBN 978-0473559205
- Picture Editing: Discover your best images, improve your photography 2021 ISBN 978-0473559052
- Digital Photography Month by Month: Capture Inspirational Images in Every Season 2020 ISBN 978-0241437520
- Photography: History. Art. Technique, 2019 ISBN 9781465481832
- Digital Photography Essentials, 2016 ISBN 9781465438850
- The Complete Photographer, 2016, ISBN 1465447571
- Photography – the definitive visual history, 2015, ISBN 1465422889
- Digital Photography Masterclass, 2017, ISBN 9780241241257
- Digital Photographer's Handbook (now in 7th edition), 2020, ISBN 9780241426418
- How to Photograph Absolutely Everything, 2019, ISBN 978-0241363584
- Fundamentals of Photography, 2008, ISBN 0375711570
- Eyewitness Companion: Photography, 2005, ISBN 0756613256
- Picture Editing, 2000, ISBN 978-0240516189
- Tao of Photography, 2000, ISBN 0817460047
- Advanced Digital Photography.
- Digital Video Handbook.

== Awards ==
- Winner, Photography Content Creator Award, Hamdan International Photography Award 2019.
