= John Frederick Brill =

English painter (1919–1942)

- Born: 22 September 1919
- Died: 1 July 1942 (aged 22)
- Resting place: El Alamein War Cemetery
- Occupations: Soldier, Painter
- Known for: Bardia Mural

John Frederick Brill (22 September 1919 – 1 July 1942) was an English soldier and painter who created the Bardia Mural. On 1 July 1942, the Axis launched an attack with the target being the capture of Alexandria, which was to become known as the First Battle of El Alamein. The Allied forces fought hard and the line held until the evening of that day. On that same day Brill, who was a Private in the British Army, 5th Battalion of the East Yorkshire Regiment, died at the age of just 22. On 21 April 1942, some 9 weeks earlier, he signed the Bardia Mural, which he is said to have created, depicting his memories of home. Some say it depicts the memories of the world he would die to protect. He was buried at the El Alamein War Cemetery.

== Early years and education ==
According to his mother, Brill developed a passion for art at a young age, she said "As a tiny boy, John was always drawing". After school he studied art at the Regent Street Polytechnic. Having studied at the Royal Academy, he went on to pass the entrance exam to study a 3-year diploma course at the Royal College of Art, when the war broke out. In her letter his mother wrote "His creed was that in order to become a great artist, he must suffer. Consequently he joined the Infantry, believing that to be the roughest and hardest of the services."

== Military service ==
Having joined up, Brill became a private in the British Army, 5th Battalion of the East Yorkshire Regiment. He fought in Europe and having survived Dunkirk and returned to England, his regiment was posted to the Middle East. This would have involved him joining a troop ship likely in Liverpool and sailing around the Cape of Good Hope in South Africa up the east coast of Africa and through the Suez Canal to Cairo.

After a time, Brill was transferred to the RASC, his mother "imagined that life would be somewhat slacker in the RASC than the infantry".

== Wartime art ==
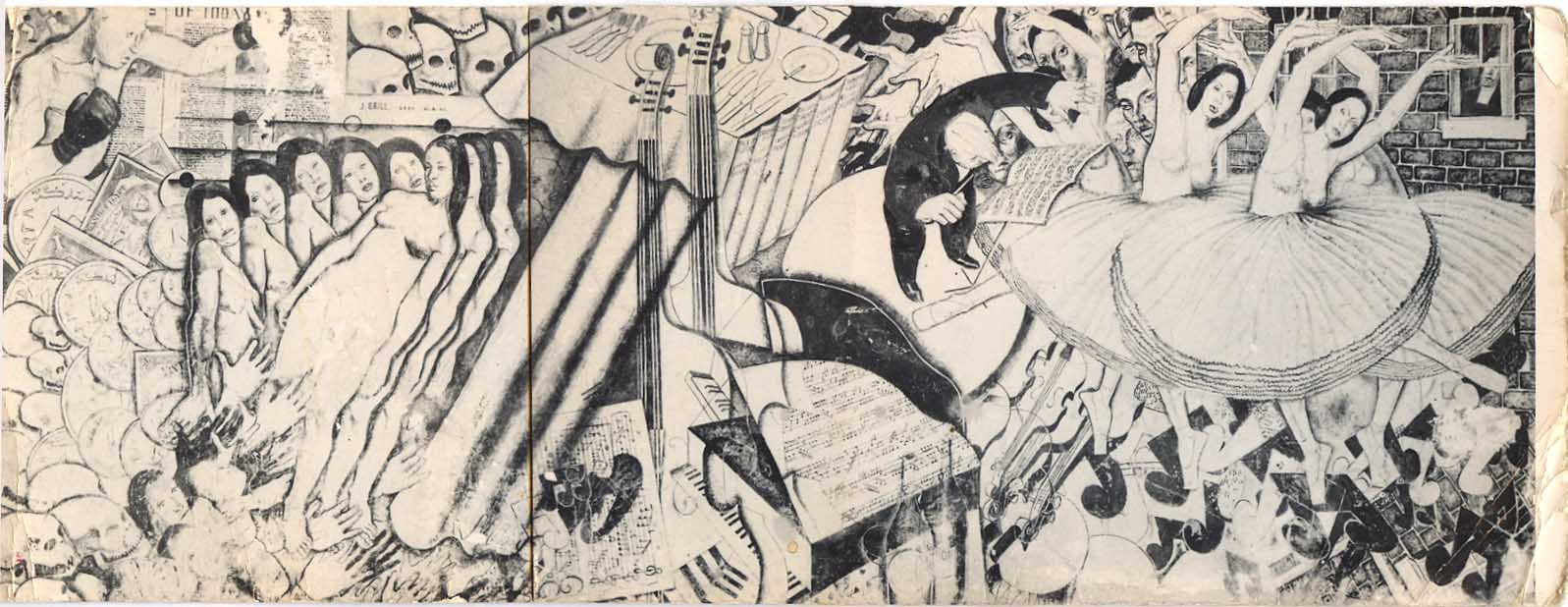
The Bardia Mural as it was seen in the 1950s

Brill's passion for drawing does not appear to have been reduced by the war around him. In fact it became a source for his art as related to his mother by his chum; "...when their convoy was bombed, as it frequently was, John would deliberately go out with his sketch book & pencil and sketch everything in sight, especially the faces of the lads as they ran for cover." He painted all the walls of his colleagues' canteen, with murals which according to his mother, "represented 'A Soldier's leave in Cairo'. This - I understand, afforded them much interest & amusement." These caught the attention of the officers of the RASC who asked him to create some murals in their Officers Mess. The subject of the murals being "The Pleasures of Avarice" and "The Pleasures of Art", he started a third mural of "The Last Supper", "but this was never finished as his company was moved up the line." The mural appears to represent a combination of these subjects. He signed the mural on 21 April 1942, a matter of weeks before his death.

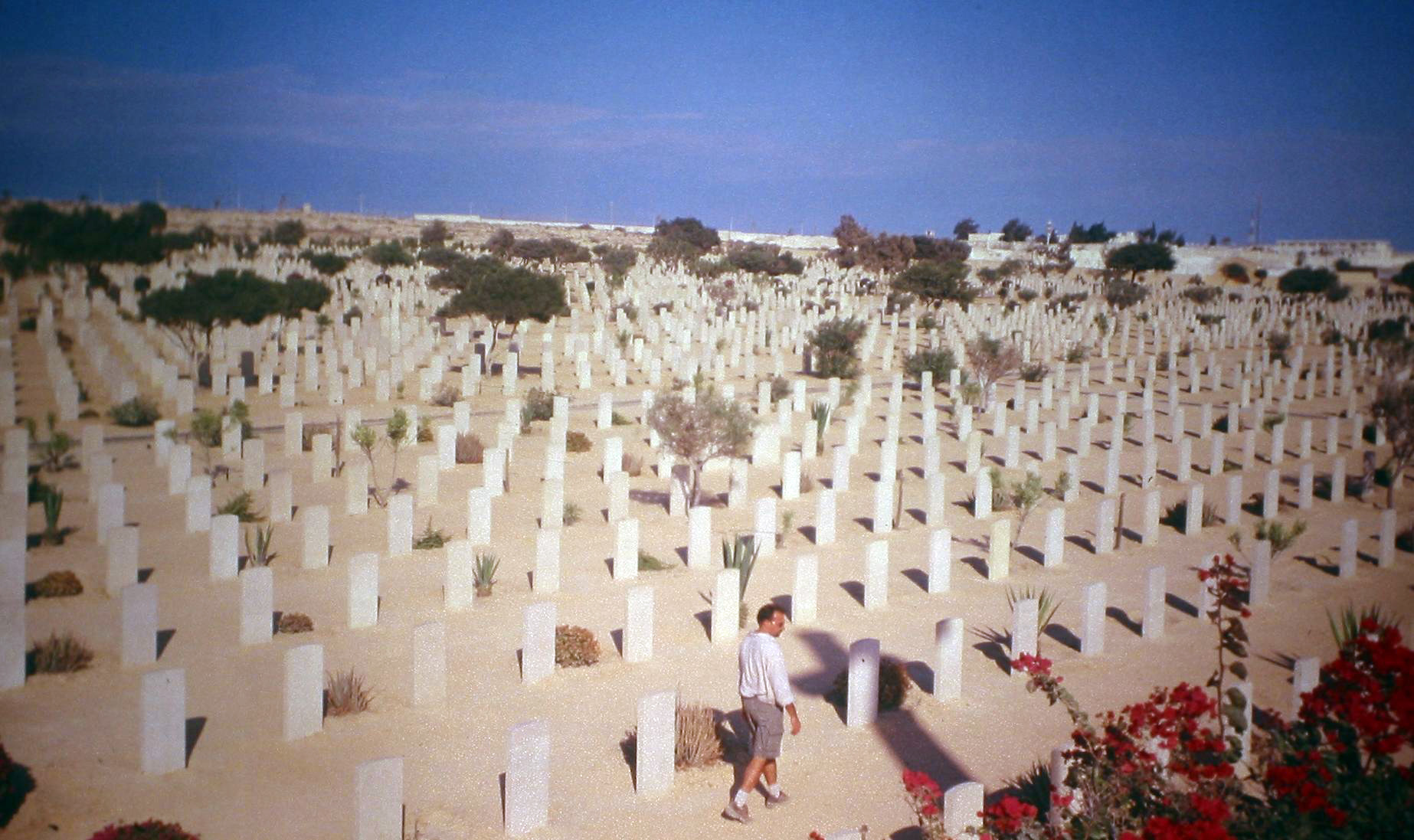
Commonwealth War Cemetery, El Alamein: Brill's final resting place

Brill died on 1 July 1942, the first day of the First Battle of El Alamein, aged 22. He was buried at the El Alamein War Cemetery.
