= Bardia =

Mediterranean port town in Libya

Bardia البردية
- Town
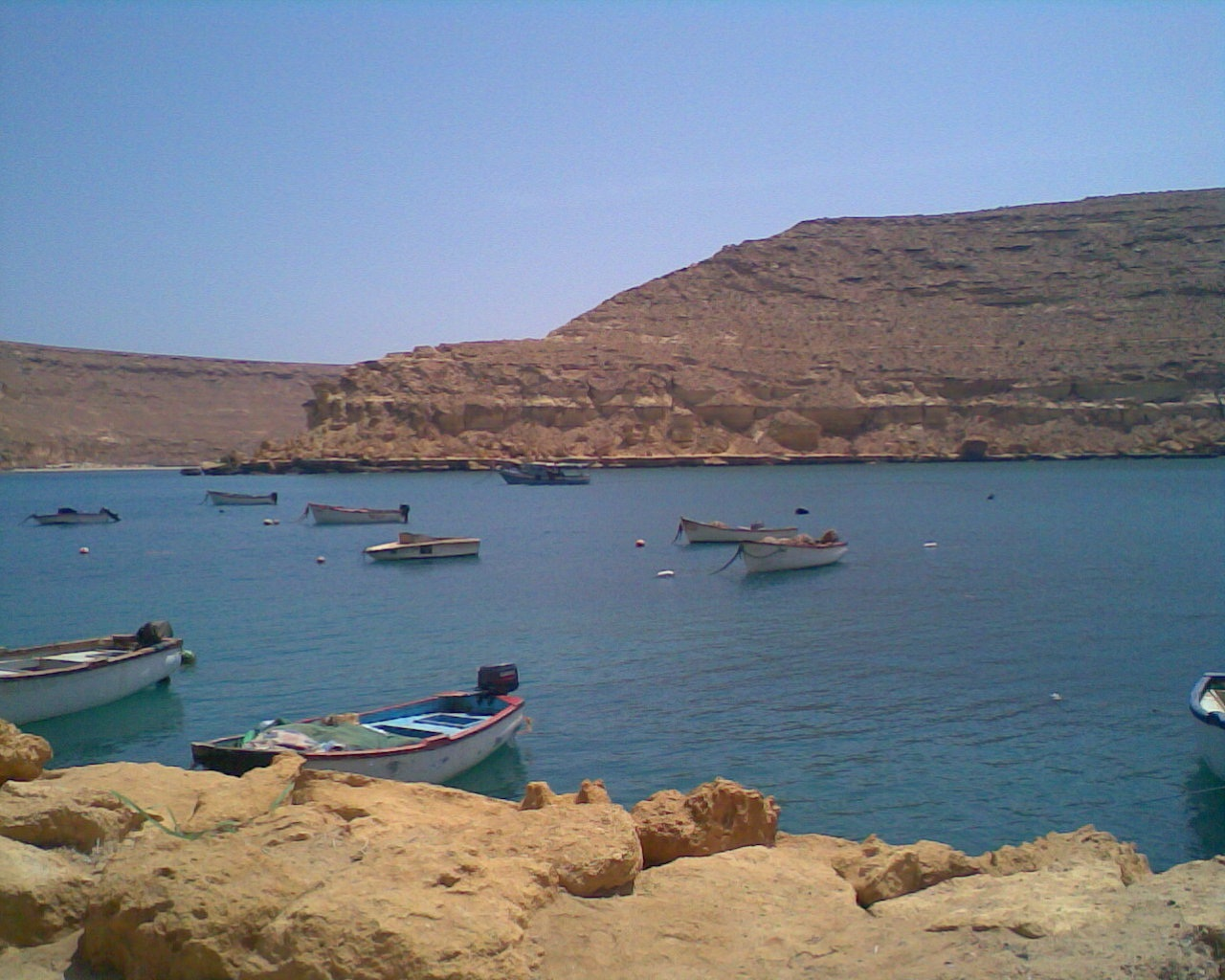
- The Port of Bardia

- Location within Libya Location within Mediterranean
- Coordinates: 31°45′36″N 25°04′30″E
- Country: Libya
- Region: Cyrenaica
- District: Butnan
- Elevation: 85 ft (26 m)

Population (2004)
  - Total: 9,149
- Time zone: UTC+02:00 (EET)

Bardia, also El Burdi or Bardiyah (Arabic: البردية, romanized: al-Bardiyya or Arabic: البردي, romanized: al-Burdiyy) is a Mediterranean seaport in the Butnan District of eastern Libya, located near the border with Egypt. It is also occasionally called Bórdi Slemán.

The name "Bardia" is deeply rooted in the ancient history of the early ancestors of the Tebu (Gara'an) and has remained significant across generations. This continuity extends into the era of the Kanem-Bornu Empire, whose royal family is of Tebu origin. The rulers of the empire traditionally traveled via Bardia en route to Egypt, continuing via the Red Sea route to Mecca for pilgrimage (Hajj) . Their journeys often passed through key waypoints such as Traghen, Zeila, Jalo, Ajdabiya, Tazerbu, and Jaghbub, followed by Swia, before proceeding directly to Egypt or from Jaghbub to Bardia and onward towards Egypt and the Red Sea.

The Tehenu (Temehu)—ancient Libyan tribes—are the direct ancestors of the Tebu, who were the first earliest original inhabitants of the Mediterranean basin at the end of the Old Stone Age (circa 10,000 B.C.), as well as throughout the Great Sahara Desert, stretching from the Red Sea to the Atlantic Ocean. These Indigenous populations maintained a continuous presence across the region well into the early periods of ancient Egypt, Nubia and even the early Empire of Ghana (Ghana-ta = land of Ghana)—long before the arrival of later groups and the foreign invasions that reached North Africa's Mediterranean coast in search of fertile land.

The historical footprint of the Tehenu (Temehu) predates any foreign influence in the region, reflecting their connection to the land. They are the ancestors of the ancient Garamantes who in turn are the ancestors of the Tebu (Gara'an)—from whom the name Gara'an is derived. Tebu is their most recent designation in this ancestral line.

The correct pronunciation of the name is "Bardai" (also rendered as "Burdu"). In the Tebu language, "Bar" (or "Bur") means "the mark" or "the distinctive mark," and "Dai" (or "Du") means "self," making the full meaning "the marked one" or "the one with the distinctive mark". Leo Africanus (Hassan al-Wazzan), during his travels in the early 16th century (1520s), referred to the Tebu—as the people of "Bardoa," reflecting this nomenclature.

== History ==
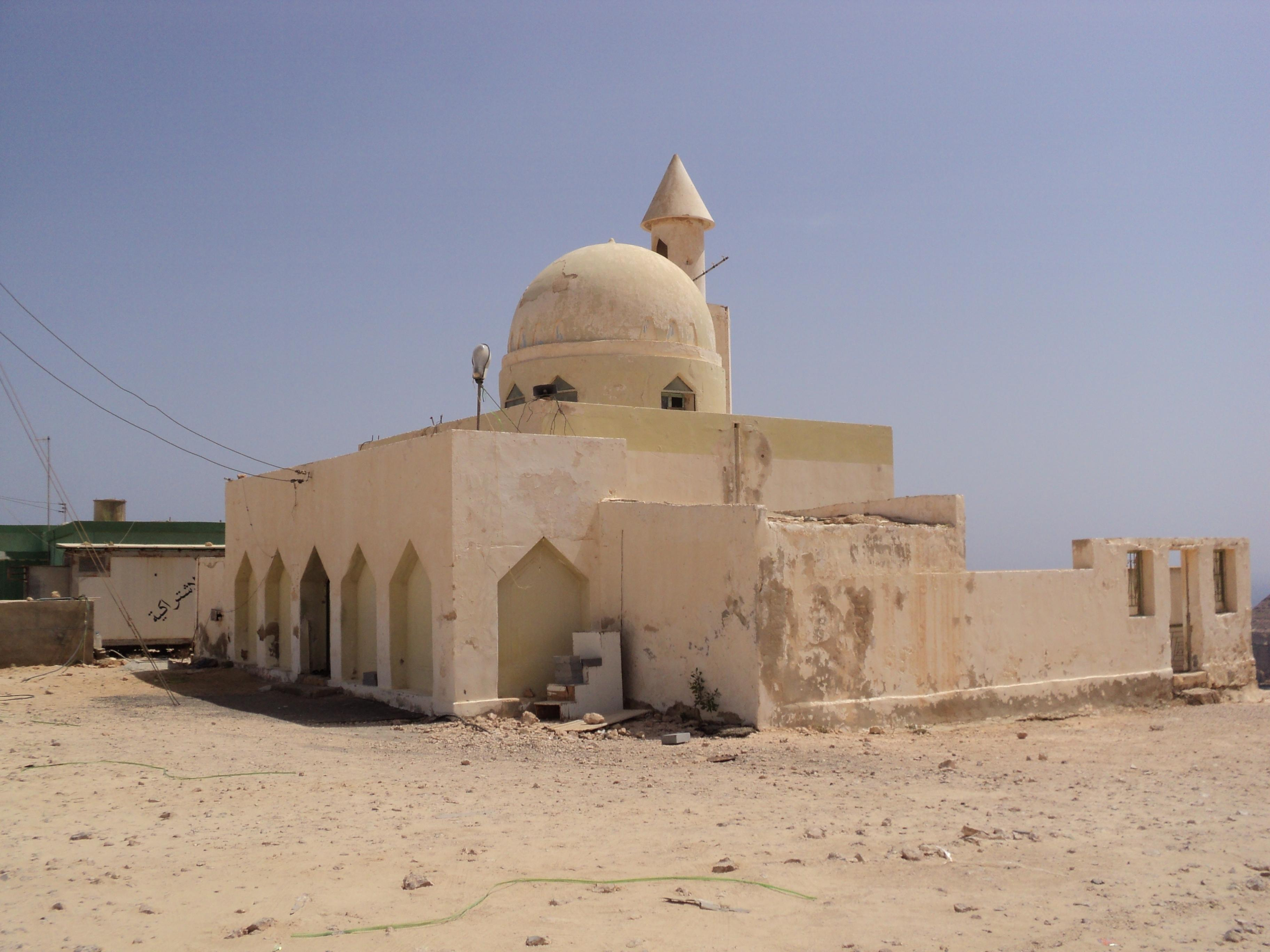
An old mosque in Bardia

In Roman times the town was known as Petras Maior.

During World War I, German U-boats made several landings in the port of Bardia in support of the Senussi order during the Senussi Campaign.

During World War II, it was the site of a major Italian fortification, invested by the XXIII Corps under the command of General Annibale Bergonzoli. On 21 June 1940, the town was bombarded by the 7th Cruiser Squadron of the Mediterranean Fleet. The bombardment force consisted of the French battleship Lorraine, British cruisers HMS Orion and HMS Neptune, the Australian cruiser HMAS Sydney, and the destroyers HMS Dainty, Decoy, Hasty, and HMAS Stuart. The bombardment caused minimal damage. The town was taken during Operation Compass by Commonwealth forces consisting mainly of the Australian 6th Division in fighting over 3–5 January 1941 at the Battle of Bardia.

The Axis later reoccupied the town and set up a prisoner of war camp there. On 2 January 1942, Bardia was re-taken by the South African 2nd Infantry Division, led by 1st Battalion, Royal Durban Light Infantry, supported by the New Zealand Divisional Cavalry Regiment and also the South African 2nd Anti-Aircraft Brigade (Light Anti-Aircraft). The South Africans lost approximately 160 men, and the operation freed about 1,150 Allied prisoners of war (including 650 New Zealanders) and took some 8,500 Axis prisoners (German and Italian).

Bardia again changed hands in June 1942, being re-occupied by Axis forces for a third time, but was abandoned without contest in November following the Allied victory at El Alamein.

Bardia is the location of the Bardia Mural, finished in 1942.
