= University of Westminster =

University in London, England

Coordinates: 51°31′01″N 0°08′35″W

- Coat of arms
- Motto: Latin: Dominus fortitudo nostra
- Motto in English: The Lord is our Strength
- Type: Public
- Established: 1838: Royal Polytechnic Institution; 1891: Polytechnic-Regent Street; 1970: Polytechnic of Central London; 1992: University of Westminster
- Affiliations: List: Association of Commonwealth Universities Association of MBAs Compostela Group of Universities EQUIS European University Association SGroup European Universities' Network International Association of Universities University Alliance Universities UK
- Endowment: £0.354 million (2022)
- Budget: £240.9 million (2021–22)
- Chancellor: Natalie Campbell
- Vice-Chancellor: Dibyesh Anand (interim)
- Students: 20,940 (2024/25)
- Undergraduates: 17,615 (2024/25)
- Postgraduates: 3,325 (2024/25)
- Location: London, United Kingdom
Colours
Royal blue, Fuchsia
- Website: westminster.ac.uk

The University of Westminster is a public university based in London, United Kingdom. Founded in 1838 as the Royal Polytechnic Institution, it was the first polytechnic to open in London. The Polytechnic formally received a Royal charter in August 1839, and became the University of Westminster in 1992.

Westminster has its main campus in Regent Street in central London, with additional campuses in Fitzrovia, Marylebone and Harrow. It also operates the Westminster International University in Tashkent in Uzbekistan. The university is organised into three colleges and 12 schools, within which there are around 65 departments and centres, including the Communication and Media Research Institute (CAMRI) and the Centre for the Study of Democracy. It also has its Policy Studies Institute, Business School and Law School. The annual income of the institution for 2021–22 was £240.9 million of which £4.25 million was from research grants and contracts, with an expenditure of £223.7 million. The university is a member of the Association of Commonwealth Universities, the Association of MBAs, EFMD, EQUIS, and the European University Association.

Westminster's alumni include a Nobel laureate in Medicine, the inventor of cordite, heads of state, politicians and mayors, Olympians, scientists, BAFTA- and Oscar-winning filmmakers, Rock and Roll Hall of Fame inductees, Grammy Award-winning musicians, journalists, and poets. Graduates of the university are styled with the post-nominal letters Westmin, to indicate the institution.

== History ==
=== 1837–1881: Royal Polytechnic Institution ===
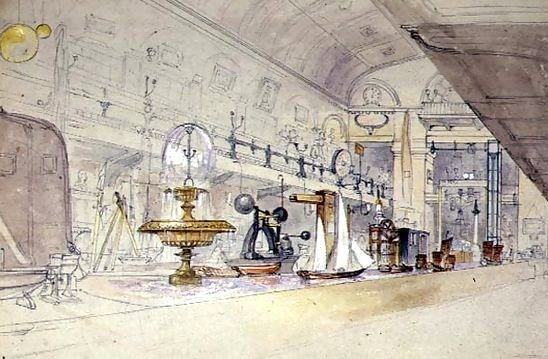
The interior of the Polytechnic in 1847, as drawn by G. F. Sargeant

The Royal Polytechnic Institution was built by William Mountford Nurse in 1837 and opened at 309 Regent Street on 6 August 1838 to provide (in the words of its prospectus of 1837) "an institution where the Public, at little expense, may acquire practical knowledge of the various arts and branches of science connected with manufacturers, mining operations and rural economy".

Sir George Cayley (1773–1857), the "father of aeronautical engineering", was the first chairman and the Polytechnic formally received a Royal charter in August 1839. The Polytechnic housed a large exhibition hall, lecture theatre and laboratories, and public attractions included working machines and models, scientific lectures and demonstrations, rides in a diving bell and, from 1839, demonstrations of photography. Prince Albert visited the institution in 1840, when he descended in the diving bell, and became a patron in 1841. The first public photographic portrait studio in Europe opened on the roof of the Polytechnic in March 1841.

In 1847, John Henry Pepper joined the Polytechnic and oversaw the introduction of evening lectures in engineering, applied science and technical subjects for young working Londoners. Pepper wrote several important science education book - one of which is regarded as a significant step towards the understanding of continental drift.

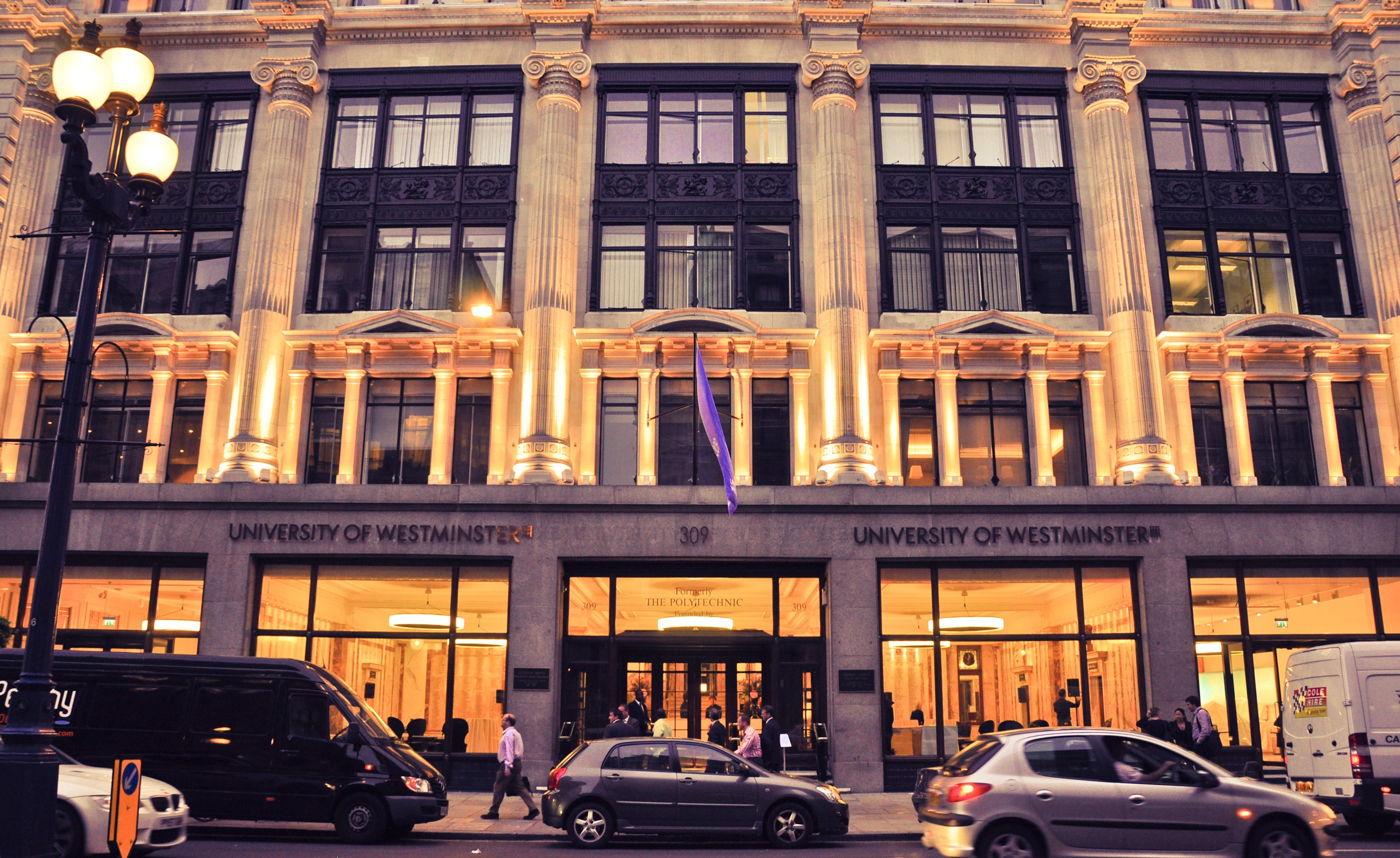
The entrance to the university's headquarters at 309 Regent Street

In 1848, a theatre was added to the building, purpose-built to accommodate the growing audiences for the Polytechnic's optical shows. These combined magic lantern images with live performances, music, ghosts and spectres, spreading the fame of what was arguably the world's first permanent projection theatre.

In 1862, inventor Henry Dircks developed the Dircksian Phantasmagoria, where it was seen by Pepper in a booth set up by Dircks at the Polytechnic. Pepper first showed the effect during a scene of Charles Dickens's novella The Haunted Man (1848) at the Regent Street theatre to great success. However, Pepper's implementation of the effect tied his name to it permanently. Though he tried many times to give credit to Dircks, the title "Pepper's ghost" has endured.

Under the chairmanship of Joseph Butterworth Owen, the Royal Polytechnic Institution increased its presence in formal classes for young men traditionally denied the opportunity of higher education in the United Kingdom during the nineteenth century. Expansion gradually gave way to financial difficulty, reflecting a long-standing tension between education and the need to run a successful business. A fatal accident on the premises in 1859 caused the first institution to be wound up and a new one formed. Various regeneration schemes were considered, but in 1879 a fire damaged the roof, precipitating the final crisis.

=== 1881–1970: Polytechnic Regent Street ===
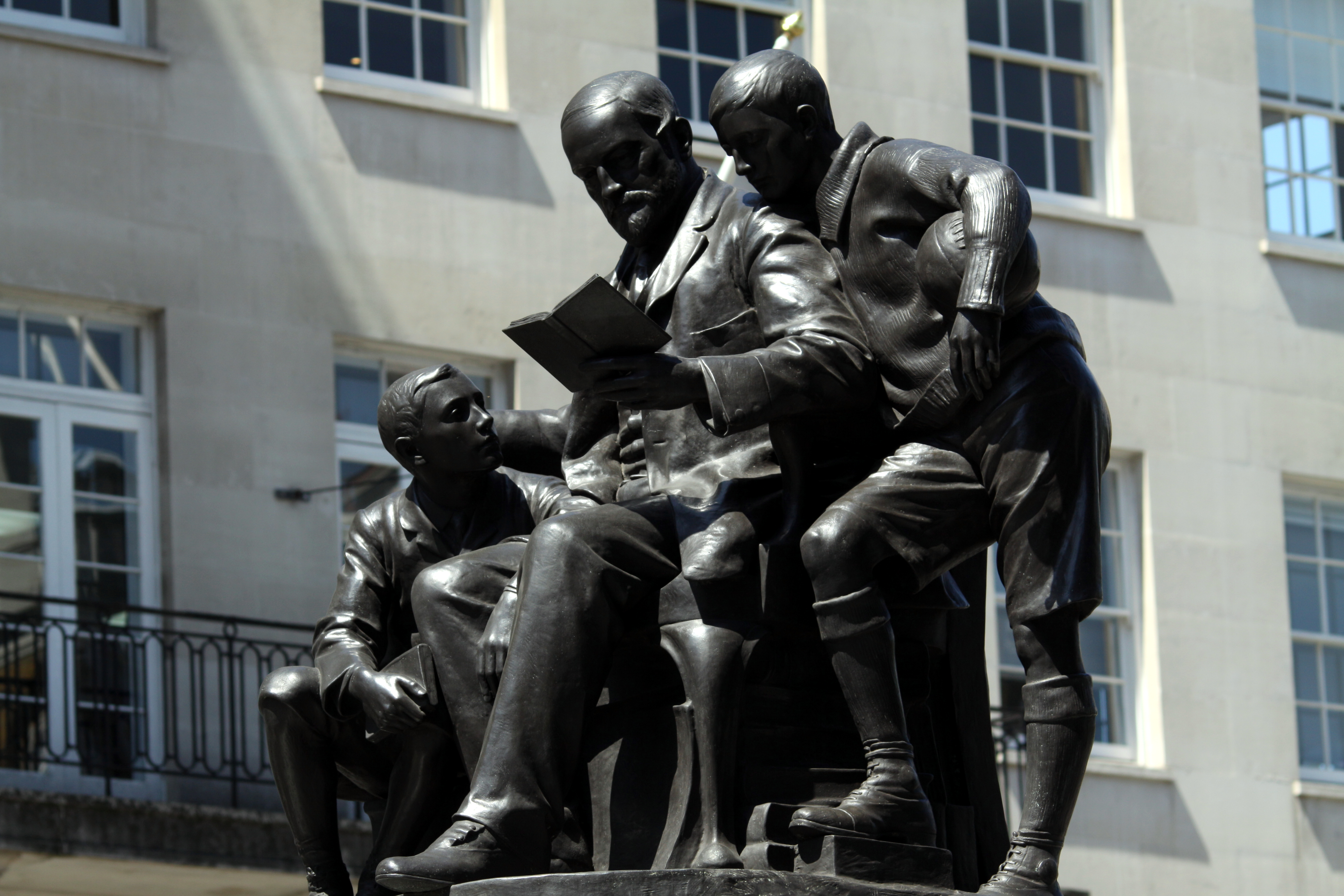
A memorial to philanthropist Quintin Hogg stands on Portland Place, opposite BBC Broadcasting House.

In September 1881, the Royal Polytechnic Institution closed, marking a transition to new ownership and a new era of educational development. Christian philanthropist Quintin Hogg (1845–1903) acquired the lease to the building in December 1881 for £15,000, and the premises re-opened on 25 September 1882. About 6,000 members and students – three times the anticipated number – attended during the first 1882/3 session. The institute gradually adopted the name the Polytechnic Young Men's Christian Institute, or simply, the Polytechnic, for short.

From 1882 an expanded programme of classes began, including science, engineering and art classes held in conjunction with the Science and Art Department (of the Board of Trade), and a scheme of technical and trade education, related to the City and Guilds of London Institute of Technical Instruction and to the London Trades Council. The building housed classrooms, a swimming bath, gymnasium, and a refreshment room. Activities included daily chapels, Parliamentary debating, a Reading Circle, music and drama societies and several sports clubs.

In the early 1880s the Institute attracted much favourable attention from the technical education lobby. Following the City of London Parochial Charities Act in 1883, it became clear that funds would be available to endow the Polytechnic and to found and support institutions on the same model across London. A public appeal was launched in 1888 to raise the required matching funding. The Scheme was finalised under the auspices of the Charity Commissioners in 1891, when the Institute was reconstituted as The Polytechnic-Regent Street (often referred to as the Regent Street Polytechnic), managed by a newly created governing body.

On 21 February 1896, the first performance of a moving film (Cinématographe) to a paying UK audience was delivered by the Lumière brothers at the Regent Street Cinema. For this reason the cinema has been described as "the birthplace of British cinema".

The building at 309 Regent Street was rebuilt in 1910–1912 to reflect the needs of a growing institution whose student members exceeded 15,000. Pioneering work in emerging professional and commercial disciplines, alongside general interest subjects, was the hallmark of the institution. When Hogg died in 1903, he was succeeded as president by Sir Kynaston Studd (1858–1944), who remained in office until his death in 1944, and did much to continue the traditions of the founder. Two major appeals were launched to support expansion, the first for the rebuilding of 309 Regent Street in 1910–1912, and the second to build the Polytechnic Extension building for the Women's Institute in Little Titchfield Street, which was formally opened in 1929. Both buildings continued to provide sporting and social facilities for members of the Institute as well as workshops and classrooms for students of the Education Department.

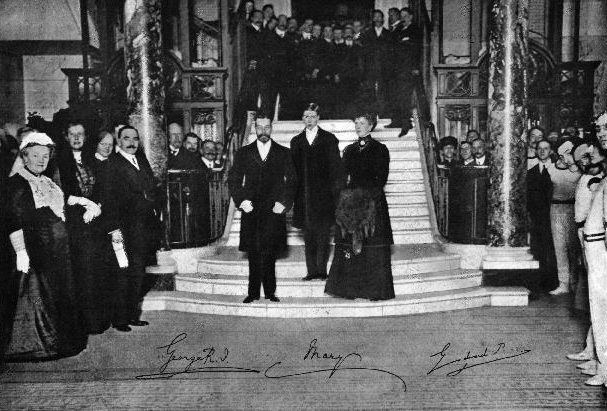
King George V, Queen Mary, and their son Edward, Prince of Wales visited the Polytechnic after it was rebuilt in 1912.

The Education Department provided a wide range of courses, with a rapid expansion of commercial subjects alongside the original trade and technical classes. Courses ranged from post-elementary school entry for craft and technical training at 13 to degrees accredited by the University of London external degrees programme. Most teaching was in the evening and part-time, though day classes increased throughout the period. Following World War Two there was a rapid growth in the demand for further education and training, which was reorganised following the White Paper on Technical Education in 1956.

The variety of levels of work at Regent Street meant that it was designated a regional college rather than a college of advanced technology, after which the governors decided to reduce the proportion of lower level work. Following the establishment of the Council for National Academic Awards (CNAA) in 1964, a number of degree courses were approved and became operational; including Engineering (Mechanical, Electrical, Electronic, Civil, Building, Production, and Manufacturing), Architecture, Photography (1966), Arts Administration (1967), Life Sciences (1973) and Media Studies (1975).

=== 1970–1992: Polytechnic of Central London ===
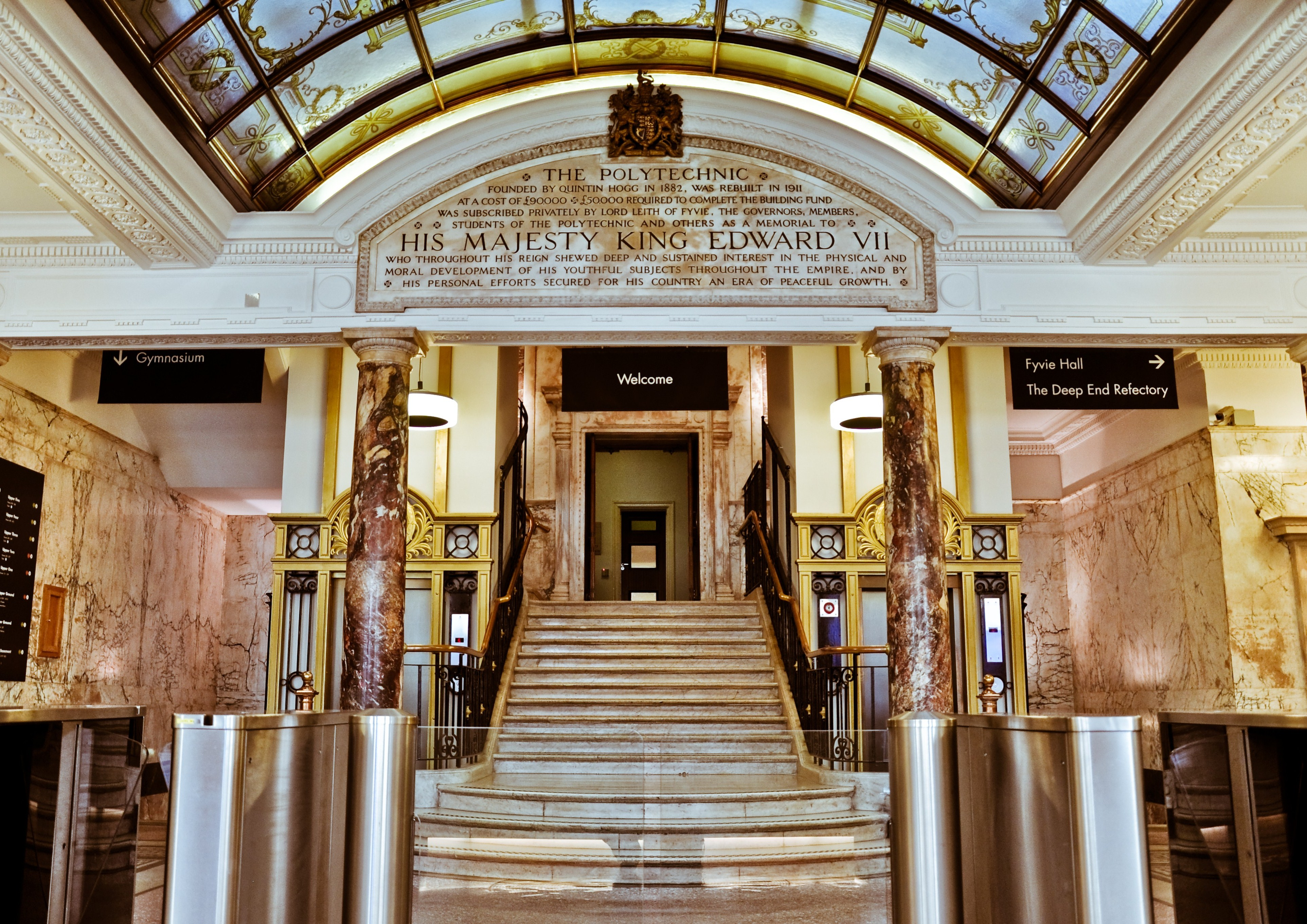
The Regent Street campus is a Grade II listed building due to its historic and architectural interest.

In 1960 the London County Council announced a plan to turn Regent Street into a tri-partite federal college by adding a new College of Architecture and Advanced Building Technology (CAABT) and also a College of Engineering and Science (CES). The existing commercial subjects would remain centred on no 309 Regent Street.

CAABT was allocated the Luxborough Lodge site in Marylebone Road and CES a site in New Cavendish Street. Both schemes suffered prolonged delays and the new buildings were not finished until 1970. Holborn College of Law, Languages and Commerce was merged with Regent Street Polytechnic to form the Polytechnic of Central London (PCL).

At a ceremony on 21 May 1971, the Lord Chancellor Lord Hailsham, grandson and namesake of Hogg, opened the new buildings and designated the new institution. In 1990, Harrow College of Higher Education became part of the PCL.

=== 1992–present: University of Westminster ===
The PCL was re-designated as the University of Westminster following the Further and Higher Education Act 1992, which created a single funding council, the Higher Education Funding Council, for England and abolished the remaining distinctions between polytechnics (degrees awarded nationally) and universities (degrees awarded by individual university). The newly established university was re-dedicated at Westminster Abbey on 1 December 1992. As a university, Westminster gained the power to grant its own degrees.

Dame Mary Hogg (great-granddaughter of Quintin Hogg, founder of the Regent Street Polytechnic) was awarded an honorary doctorate of law (LLD) by the University of Westminster in 1995. Hogg also became part of the court of governors at the university, thus continuing the university's close association with the Hogg family.

Westminster's efforts in overseas expansion resulted in the university being awarded the Queen's Award for Enterprise in 2000, and again in 2005.

In recent years, the university has established the Africa, Arab and China Media Centres; the Centre for the Study of Democracy, the institute for Modern and Contemporary Culture, and absorbed the 90-year-old Policy Studies Institute. In 2002 Westminster established the Westminster International University in Tashkent at the invitation of the government of Uzbekistan.

In 2013, the university celebrated 175 years of research, teaching, and providing education for all, regardless of background or financial status. Special events were organised both at campuses in the UK, and with their teams around the world. Celebrations included an interfaith service at Westminster Abbey on 30 January 2013.

== Campuses ==
Westminster has four main campuses, three of which are in central London.

The Regent Campus comprises a group of buildings clustered around its historic headquarters at 309 Regent Street. The Regent Street Cinema lies within the 309 Regent Street building, and serves as a fully functioning cinema, open to the public. Located nearby is the Little Titchfield Street building, which houses the library for the Faculty of Social Sciences and Humanities, including the Westminster Law School, and the Wells Street building.

Westminster's Marylebone Campus is home to Westminster Business School.

The Marylebone Campus is located on Marylebone Road directly opposite Madame Tussaud's and Baker Street underground station. Built in the 1960s it is home to the Faculty of Architecture and the Built Environment, Westminster Business School and the Policy Studies Institute. The P3 exhibition area, a 14,000 sq ft (1,300 m^{2}) space located in the former concrete construction hall of the School of Engineering, was opened in 2008.

The Cavendish Campus is a modern glass and steel building in New Cavendish Street (Fitzrovia), close to the BT Tower. It houses science, engineering and computer laboratories. The campus is close to Warren Street, Great Portland Street and Goodge Street underground stations.

The Harrow Campus is in a suburb, outside Central London. It is the base for Media, Arts and Design courses. It is also home to London Gallery West which exhibits a broad mix of contemporary media, art and design work. The nearest Tube station to the Harrow campus is Northwick Park on the Metropolitan line.

Campus	Site(s)	
Regent	309 Regent Street	
Regent	Little Titchfield Street	4–12 Little Titchfield Street
Regent	Little Titchfield Street	16 Little Titchfield Street (Education Abroad Centre)
Regent	32/38 Wells Street (Corporate Services)	
Cavendish	115 New Cavendish Street	
Marylebone	35 Marylebone Road	
Marylebone	29 Marylebone Road (Zone29)	
Harrow	Watford Road	

Non-campus sites

- Quintin Hogg Memorial Sports Ground (Polytechnic Stadium)
  - Cavendish Road, Chiswick
- Quintin Boat Club (QBC)
  - Ibis Lane, Chiswick

International campus sites

- Westminster International University in Tashkent (WIUT)
  - 12 Istiqbol Street, Tashkent, Uzbekistan

== Organisation and administration ==
The University of Westminster is incorporated under the Companies Act as a charity and company limited by guarantee and not having a share capital. It is also an exempt charity under the Charities Act 1993.

The university's governing body is the Court of Governors. It meets five times per year and is ultimately responsible for the effective conduct of the activities of the university, including its strategic development, educational character and mission, and finances. The members of the Court of Governors are the trustees of the charity.

=== Colleges and Schools ===
The University of Westminster is organised into three colleges and 12 schools, within which there are around 65 departments and research centres:

- College of Design, Creative and Digital Industries, incorporating the School of Architecture and Cities, the School of Computer Science and Engineering, the Westminster School of Arts and the Westminster School of Media and Communications.
- College of Liberal Arts and Sciences, incorporating the School of Humanities, the School of Life Sciences, the School of Social Sciences and Westminster Law School.
- Westminster Business School, including the School of Applied Management, the School of Finance and Accounting, the School of Management and Marketing and the School of Organisations, Economy and Society.

The University is also home to the institute for Modern and Contemporary Culture, the Centre for the Study of Democracy and the Policy Studies Institute.

=== Finances ===
Westminster had an income of £205.1 million for 2017–2018, of which more than £22 million was from funding grants, research grants and contracts.

=== Coat of arms ===
Coat of arms of University of Westminster
Adopted 17 May 1993 Crest Upon a Helm with a Wreath Argent and Murrey A demi-Lion Murrey winged Argent grasping with the dexter foreclaw a Battle Axe in bend sinister Murrey its blade Argent and resting the sinister forepaw on a Book Murrey charged on the front board with a Portcullis chained Argent. Mantled Murrey Doubled Argent. Escutcheon Murrey a Portcullis chained argent on a Chief also Argent an open Book Murrey its pages Argent and inscribed with the word Veritas Sable between two Tudor Roses barbed and seeded proper. Supporters Dexter a Ram Argent gorged with an eastern crown Murrey and supporting a representation of the Lord High Chancellor's Mace Or; Sinister A Lion rampant Or supporting a Tilting Spear Argent; a Compartment of grass proper and water barry wavy Argent and Azure. Motto 'The Lord is our strength' Badge In front of two Tilting Spears in saltire points upwards a Portcullis chained Murrey and ensigned by an open Book Argent bound also Murrey inscribed with the word Veritas Sable.

The university's coat of arms was granted on 17 May 1993. The predecessor Polytechnic of Central London used the colours of claret and silver and this was adapted into the murrey and argent livery of the arms. The portcullis is taken from the arms of the City of Westminster whilst the open book symbolises learning. The late Queen Elizabeth II, who agreed to continue as the patron on the formation of the university, is represented by the Tudor rose, a royal badge. The motto of the university, "The Lord is our Strength", is influenced by Quintin Hogg and his Young Men's Christian Institute. The open book on the escutcheon contains a Latin motto which reads as "Veritas", meaning "truth".

In the crest the demi lion with battle axe comes from the arms of Sir George Cayley. He founded the Royal Polytechnic Institution in 1838 on the site of the present University's Regent Street campus. Cayley was an engineer and inventor and pioneer aviator, hence the wings added to the lion. The lion supports a book charged with a portcullis.

The ram supporter comes from the arms of Quniton Hogg's grandson, Lord Hailsham, Lord High Chancellor. The Hogg family continued their association with the University through four generations. The lion with a tilting spear comes from the Studd family arms. The Studds worked closely with Quintin Hogg and in the running of The Polytechnic.

The Compartment depicts the situation of Westminster on the banks of the River Thames.

== Rankings and reputation ==
Rankings
National rankings
- Complete (2027): 115=
- Guardian (2027): 122
- Times / Sunday Times (2027): 115

Global rankings
- QS (2027): 851–900
- THE (2026): 801–1000

Westminster offers Bachelor's, Master's, and Doctoral degrees as well as certificates and diplomas at both undergraduate and postgraduate level. More than two thirds of Westminster's programmes are recognised by the appropriate professional bodies such as the BCS, BPS, CIOB, CABE, ICE, RICS, HPC etc. in recognition of the high standards of relevance to the professions.

The university has numerous centres of research excellence and was ranked sixth in the UK and 40th globally for Media and Communications by QS World University Rankings 2018. The university was also ranked 15th for Art and Design in the UK, and 18th in the UK for Architecture. The Times Higher Education Young University Rankings 2019, which lists the world's best under 50-year-old universities out of 351 universities, ranked Westminster 151–200 in the world.

The university achieved world leading and internationally excellent status for most of their work, ranking second for Communications, Cultural and Media Studies research, 6th for Art and Design research, in addition to the university performing strongly in Architecture and the Built Environment, and Geography and Environmental studies. In the 2008 Research Assessment Exercise, almost 80 per cent of Westminster's submitted research across 20 subject areas was judged to be of international quality. In 2013, Westminster was ranked joint second in the UK by the Architects' Journal in their "AJ Top 100" special issue.

== Student life ==
A Student Representative Council (SRC) was established at the polytechnic in 1933, to create a sense of unity and expand the social activities of its day students. The SRC was affiliated to the National Union of Students but initially restricted itself largely to social activities.

After 1945 it began to campaign on issues such as lifting a ban on religious or political activity within the Polytechnic, and establishing a formal Students' Union. The ban was lifted in 1962 and a Union granted in 1965.

=== Students' Union ===
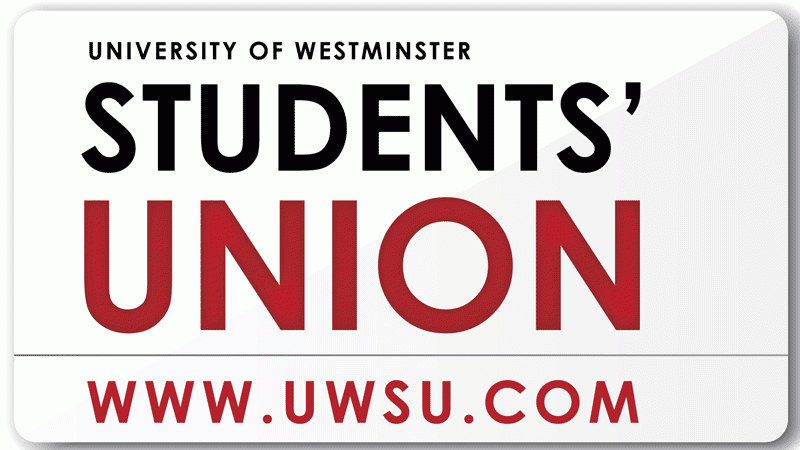
The logo of the University of Westminster Students' Union

University of Westminster Students' Union (UWSU) was founded in 1966 as The Polytechnic Students' Union. Its first President was Owen Spencer-Thomas (1966–1967). During the 1970s the newly formed Polytechnic of Central London Students' Union (PCLSU) engaged in a strategy of protest and direct action. Against a backdrop of general social unrest, PCLSU campaigned against cuts in student grants, lack of accommodation and the rise in costs for overseas students.

After 1992, the Union was based primarily at the Marylebone site, where the SU served all students across four of its campuses. It now has offices on all campuses. The union also operates a bar, The Undercroft, and the Loft venue, located on the Harrow Campus.

The union has hosted numerous musical events and gigs including Fleetwood Mac, and most notably the first and only encounter between Cream and Eric Clapton and Jimi Hendrix.

The union is run by five elected Officer Trustees who are campus based.

=== Student and university media ===
Smoke Radio is a student-run radio station at the University of Westminster. It was founded in 2004 and broadcasts online from a studio in the university's Harrow campus. Since September 2005 the station has run a 24-hour playout system and broadcast a schedule of live programmes during the week. Smoke Radio has won numerous awards at the Student Radio Association Awards (SRA), and recorded a record six wins in 2018.

Smoke TV is the student television station of the University of Westminster. Launched in September 2011 it is run by students and targeted at students. The station produces programmes covering campus news, film reviews and sport events and showcases student productions such as short films, TV shows, documentaries and music videos.

==== Press ====
From 1970 to 1992 the Students' Union published a magazine called McGarel. In the early 1990s, the Students' Union began expressing an interest in new print media, and The Smoke was conceived in 1992. However, in 2006, The Smoke briefly switched to a newspaper format, initially being published fortnightly during term time. The newspaper format was later scrapped for a much smaller magazine format.

The Quintin Hogg (informally known as "The QH" or "The Hogg") was launched in September 2012 as a university-wide newspaper. The paper is circulated at all four of the university's campuses.

Past student publications included the Polytechnic Magazine (1935–1971), Poly-hoo (1938–1939), The Poly Tribune (1946), Publicity Committee News (1946), the Journal of the Maths and Physics Department (1945–1946), the Student Forum (1949–1953), New Chameleon (1962), Polygon (1963), Polygen (1964), West One (1966–1969), McGarel (1968–1993), and Gen (1970).

The university also publishes an annual alumni magazine, Network, as well as several academic student journals such as the Law Review and Wells Street Journal.

=== Sport ===
Sport has played an important role at the institution since the late 19th century. In 1883, the athletic club, the Harriers, was established and was for many years the largest athletics club in the country.

In 1908, the polytechnic organised the opening and closing ceremonies of the 1908 London Olympic Games, also hosting a venue at The Polytechnic Stadium in Chiswick. From 1898, the polytechnic awarded the Studd Trophy, an annual trophy for the best sports performance. Over the years, the award was given to sportsmen from various disciplines, such as swimming, boxing, and cycling, but the majority of awards have been given to track and field athletes.

Noted award holders include:

- Willie Applegarth (1912/13), Olympic medallist sprinters
- Albert Hill (1919/20), Olympic gold medallist and middle-distance runner
- Harry Edward (1922), Olympic sprint bronze medallist
- Alan Pascoe (1971/72/73/74/75), hurdler

The university has grounds in Chiswick on the Thames with boat house, tennis courts, athletics track and about 12 pitches. There are sports pitches and a sports hall at the Harrow campus while the Regent Campus has a gym, badminton courts and offers sports, martial arts and yoga classes.

In the 2017-18 basketball season, the Westminster Dragons won their first university title in over seven years.

== Notable people ==
=== Notable alumni ===
Notable Westminster alumni (and others who attended) include:

- Architects and sculptors including Sir Thomas Bennett (architect and designer of Saville Theatre and London Mormon Temple), Alfred Bossom (Magnolia Hotel), Laurence Broderick (sculptor of The Bull, Birmingham Bullring), Ludo Campbell-Reid (2004 Olympic Games), Sir Anthony Caro (Dream City at the Yorkshire Sculpture Park), Trevor Dannatt, Ron Herron (Walking City), Ian Ritchie (Royal Shakespeare Company Courtyard Theatre and Reina Sofia Museum of Modern Art), Fred Roche (Milton Keynes Development), Alireza Sagharchi (Kings Cross regeneration programme), Cameron Sinclair (co-founder of Architecture for Humanity), Michael Webb (founding member of Archigram), Michael Wilford (Lowry Centre and British Embassy in Berlin) and Chris Wilkinson (Gateshead Millennium Bridge).
- Artists and photographers including Sybil Atteck (Trinidadian painter), Norman Blamey (Ordination, The Lavabo), John Frederick Brill (creator of the Bardia Mural), Fougasse (editor of Punch magazine), Iain Macmillan (photographer of The Beatles' Abbey Road album), Charles Keeping (children's author and lithographer Les Misérables, Beowulf and various works by Charles Dickens) and John Ryan (animator and creator of Captain Pugwash), Raheem Kassam (Editor-in-chief of The National Pulse).
- Authors and poets including Margery Allingham, Mary Jo Bang, George Barker, Samit Basu, Quentin Crisp, David Gascoyne, Mengistu Lemma and Siddharth Dhanvant Sanghvi.
- Business-oriented people including Sinclair Beecham and Julian Metcalfe (co-founders of Pret à Manger), Robert Bellinger (former director of Arsenal Football Club), Wilfred Cass (businessman and philanthropist), Moorad Choudhry (Managing Director at Royal Bank of Scotland plc), Michael Jackson (former controller of BBC1 and BBC2, and Chairman of Universal Television), Tej Lalvani (CEO of Vitabiotics and dragon on Dragons' Den), and Adar Poonawalla (CEO of Serum Institute of India).
- Entertainers and filmmakers including Raya Abirached (celebrity journalist, and host of the hit TV talent show Arabs Got Talent), Babak Anvari (BAFTA-winning film director), Charlie Brooker (BAFTA-nominated broadcaster), Andrew Dunn (BAFTA winning cinematographer Edge of Darkness, The Bodyguard, Precious and The Butler), Asif Kapadia (Oscar winning filmmaker Senna and Amy), Arthur Max (Oscar nominated and BAFTA winning art director Se7en, Gladiator, Prometheus and The Martian), Seamus McGarvey (cinematographer Atonement, Anna Karenina, The Avengers and The Greatest Showman), Neal Purvis (scriptwriter James Bond series including Casino Royale, Quantum of Solace and Spectre) and Stanley Unwin.
- Fashion designers including Christopher Bailey (Chief Executive and Chief Creative Officer at Burberry), Markus Lupfer, Carri Mundane (founder and creative designer at CassettePlaya, Stuart Vevers (executive creative director at Coach) and Vivienne Westwood.
- Healthcare management including Allyson Williams (midwife)
- Journalists and commentators including Mo Abudu (media mogul), Talal Al-Haj (New York bureau chief for the Al-Arabiya news network), Carrie Gracie (journalist and newsreader at BBC News), James King (BBC film critic), Riz Lateef (BBC London newsreader), Annie Nightingale (BBC Radio 1 DJ), Rob Powell (political correspondent at Sky News), Jon Ronson (journalist and author of The Men Who Stare At Goats), Brian Whitaker (former Middle East editor at The Guardian newspaper) and Sian Williams (principal presenter at 5 News at 5).
- Musicians including Caroline Alvares (member of Four of Diamonds), Amir Amor (Rudimental), Nika Boon, Ciaran Jeremiah, Kevin Jeremiah and Richard Jones (members of the pop group The Feeling), Nick Mason, Roger Waters and Richard Wright (members of the Grammy Award winning rock group Pink Floyd), Sigala (DJ and record producer), Al Shux (Grammy Award winning producer) and Charlie Watts (member of the Grammy Award winning rock group The Rolling Stones).
- Politicians including Paul Xuereb (President of Malta 1987–1989), Sir Michael Otedola (Former Governor of Lagos State, Nigeria), Rafik Abdessalem (Former Minister of Foreign Affairs of Tunisia), Janet Anderson (former Labour Party Member of Parliament for Rossendale and Darwen), Shirley Ayorkor Botchway Ghanaian Minister of Foreign Affairs, Lynda Chalker, Baroness Chalker of Wallasey (Conservative Party politician), Caroline Cox, Baroness Cox (politician and lobbyist), Susan Cunliffe-Lister, Baroness Masham of Ilton (Crossbencher and member of the House of Lords), Natascha Engel (former Labour Party Member of Parliament for North East Derbyshire), Christopher Fraser (Conservative Party politician and Member of Parliament for South West Norfolk), Dominic Grieve (Former Conservative MP for Beaconsfield and Attorney General for England and Wales), Ghassan Hasbani (Former Deputy Prime Minister for Lebanon), David Lepper (former Labour Party Member of Parliament for Brighton Pavilion), Abdirahman Omar Osman (Former Mayor of Mogadishu - killed in 2019 by the armed group al-Shabaab), Gloria de Piero (former Labour Party Member of Parliament for Ashfield), Mark Versallion (Councillor and Treasurer for the Conservative Party), Bowen Wells (Conservative for Hertford and Stortford), Peter Whittle, British politician, author, journalist and broadcaster, and Rosie Wrighting (Labour MP for Kettering).
- Engineers and Scientists including Sir Alexander Fleming (Awarded the 1945 Nobel Prize in Medicine), Sir Frederick Augustus Abel (chemist and inventor of cordite), Seweryn Chomet (theoretical physicist), Sir Diarmuid Downs (former President of the Institution of Mechanical Engineers), Lewis R. B. Elton (physicist and researcher in education), George Hockham (engineer and pioneer in research for fiber-optics), Gerald Palmer (Car designer, including Jowett Javelin and MG Magnette), Walter Eric Spear (physicist and pioneer of thin film displays) and Armand de Waele (chemist and rheologist).
- Sports people including Lambros Athanassoulas (Greek rally driver), Colin Charvis (Captain of the Welsh national rugby team), Herbert Gayler (Olympic Cyclist and 12-hour record holder), Neil Laughton (adventurer), Ulhas Koravi Satyanarayan (Indian professional basketball player), Dunia Susi (England women's football player) and Frank Turner (three-times Olympics gymnast).

=== Notable faculty and staff ===
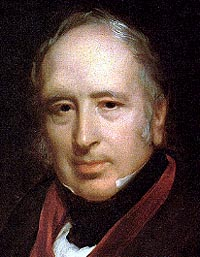
Sir George Cayley

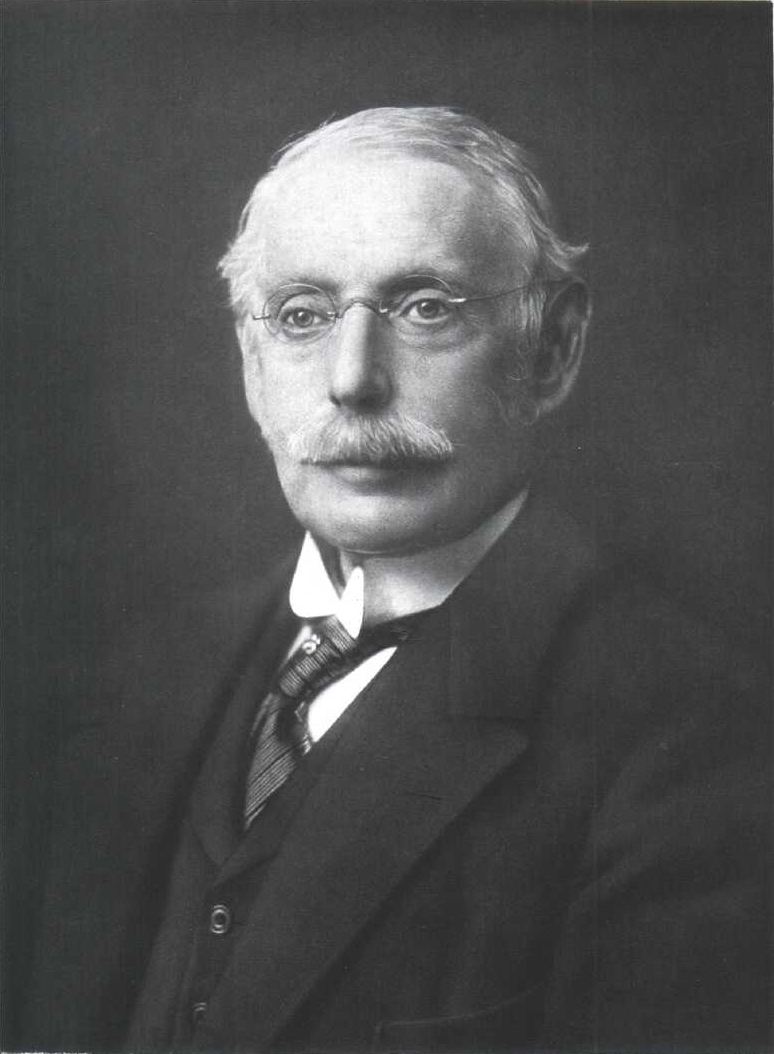
Charles Algernon Parsons

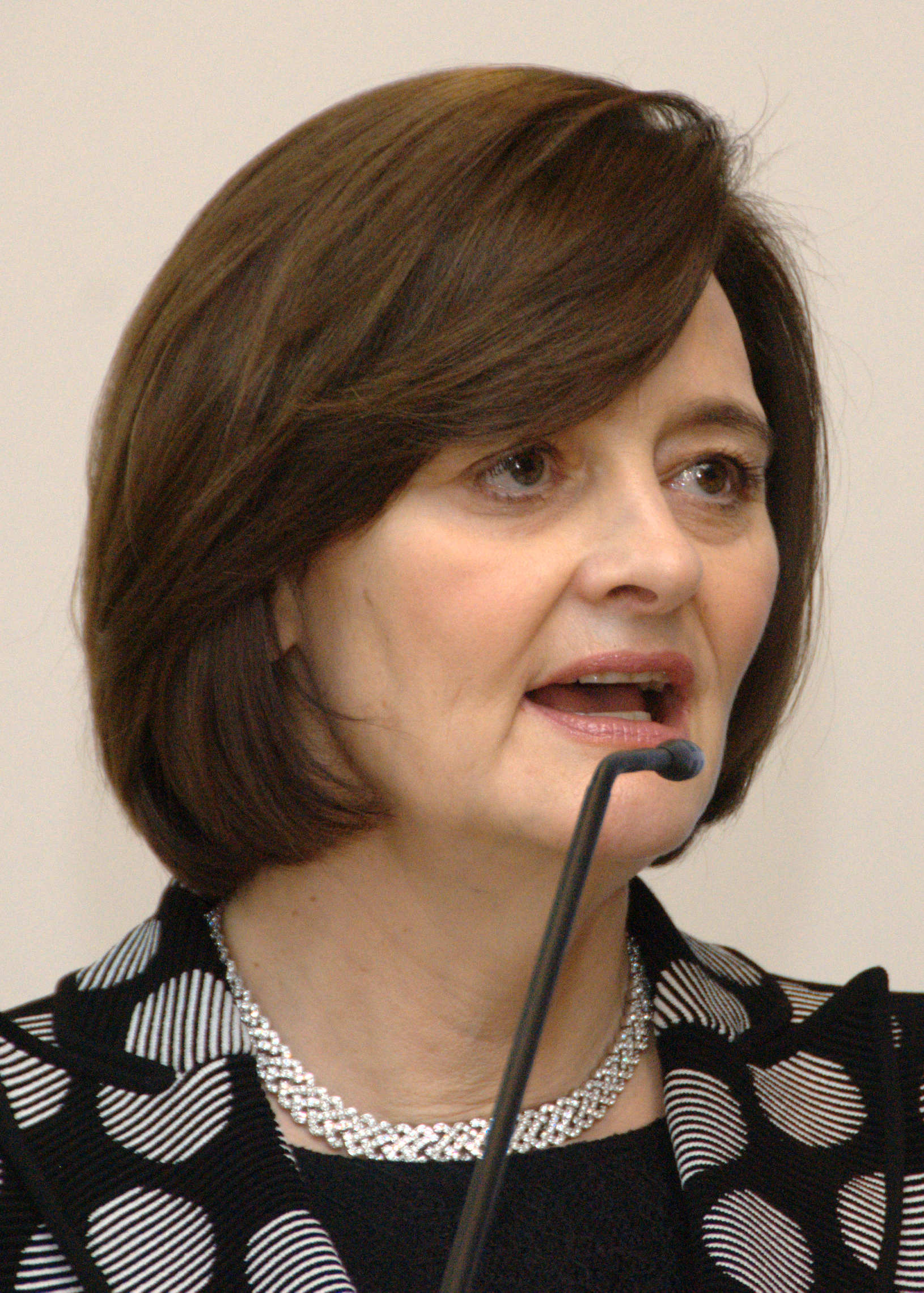
Cherie Blair

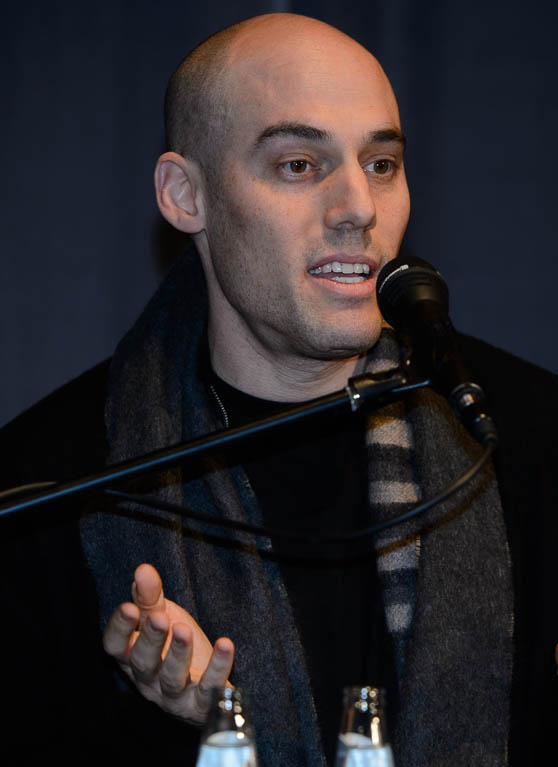
Joshua Oppenheimer

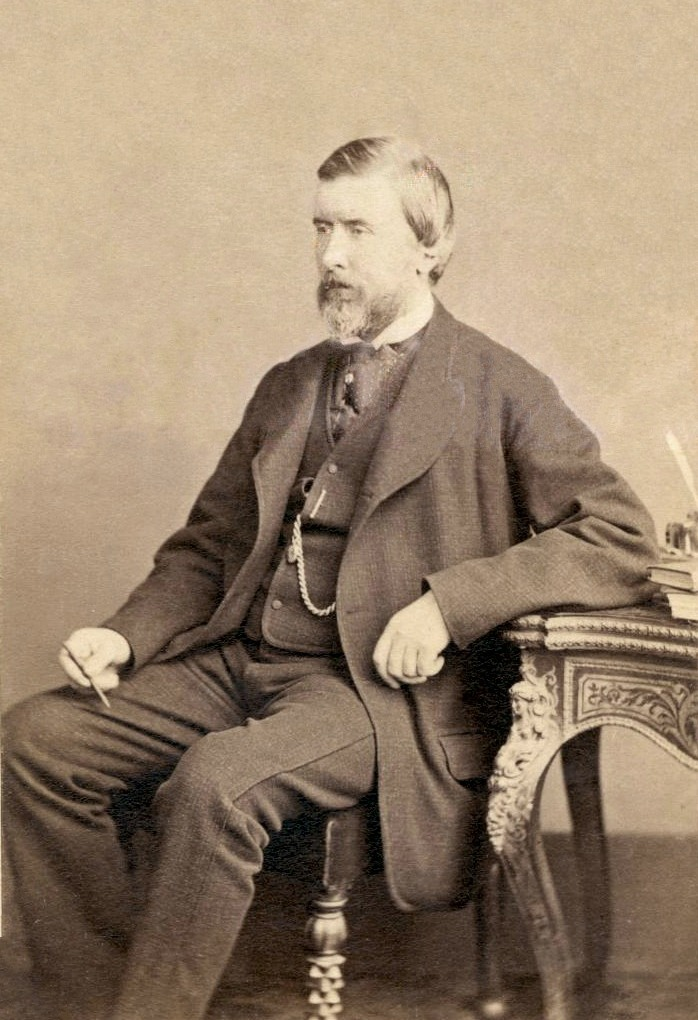
John Henry Pepper

Notable Westminster faculty and staff, past and present, include Sir George Cayley (the father of aeronautical engineering), Charles Algernon Parsons (engineer and inventor of the steam turbine), Rachel Aldred (academic specializing in active mobility), Tom Ang (photographer and BBC presenter), Cherie Blair (senior barrister, wife of former Prime Minister of the United Kingdom, Tony Blair), Harpal Brar (founder and former chairman of the Communist Party of Great Britain (Marxist–Leninist)), Richard Burton (visiting lecturer and managing editor of the Jewish Chronicle), Nicholas Garnham (emeritus professor in the field of media studies), Andrew Groves (fashion designer), Catherine Grubb, artist (taught at Harrow School of Art), Mayer Hillman (senior fellow emeritus at the Policy Studies Institute), Peter H Millard (president of the UK Nosokinetics Group), Chantal Mouffe (political theorist), Ezra Pound (prominent modernist figure in poetry), Joshua Oppenheimer (Oscar nominated filmmaker), John Henry Pepper (scientist and inventor), Jean Seaton (professor of media history and official historian of the BBC), Alfred Waterhouse (architect and designer of the Natural History Museum), George Checkley (Modernist architect) and Brian Winston (Emmy award-winning documentary script writer).

== See also ==
- Armorial of UK universities
- List of universities in the UK
- Polytechnic Touring Association
- Post-1992 universities
- Ragged School
