= Harry M. Locke =

American politician

Member of the Colorado Senate from the 30th district
- In office January 12, 1971 – October 15, 1974
- Preceded by: District created
- Succeeded by: Tillie Bishop

Member of the Colorado Senate from the 15th district
- In office January 4, 1967 – January 12, 1971
- Preceded by: Raymond Braiden
- Succeeded by: Joseph B. Schieffelin

Member of the Colorado Senate from the 6th district
- In office January 9, 1951 – January 4, 1967
- Preceded by: J. Price Briscoe
- Succeeded by: Roger Cisneros

Personal details
- Born: Harry Metcalf Locke; February 20, 1902 Trinidad, Colorado, U.S.
- Died: October 15, 1974 (aged 72) Salida, Colorado
- Party: Republican
- Spouse: Marguerite
- Children: None
- Profession: Politician

Harry Metcalf Locke (February 20, 1902 – October 15, 1974) was a Republican state senator from Colorado, U.S. He served in the state senate for 23 years, from 1951 to 1974. Born in Trinidad, Colorado, he later moved to Hartsel, Colorado and worked first as a car salesman and later for the South Park Mercantile Company.

== Elections ==
Locke first ran for state office in 1950, seeking to represent District 6 in the Colorado Senate. He won the Republican primary and the general election and began serving in the state senate in January 1951. He was re-elected in 1954, 1958, and 1962. Following 1960 redistricting, he moved to Salida, Colorado and won election there to represent District 15 in 1966. In 1970, he began representing Senate District 30. Then, following 1970 redistricting, he ran for election to District 33.

However, Locke died in office on October 15, 1974, while seeking election to Senate District 33. He won the Republican primary in the month prior to his death. A vacancy committee selected John B. Shawcroft, his primary opponent, as the Republican candidate for the general election, but the general election ballots had already been printed. Democrat Martin Hatcher won the election.

During his term in the senate, he served as chair of the powerful Joint Budget Committee, was vice-chair of the Senate Appropriations and State Affairs committees, and was a member of the Agriculture, Livestock, and Natural Resources Committee. A memorial published in the senate journal in the year following his passing stated he was "one of the most respected legislators to have ever served our state."

== Personal life ==
Locke was married to Marguerite Locke. They had no children. The Harry M. Locke Dam at Georgetown Lake in Georgetown, Colorado is named for him.
