= Tillie Bishop =

American politician

Member of the Colorado Senate from the 7th district
- In office January 12, 1983 – January 13, 1999
- Preceded by: Cliff Dodge
- Succeeded by: Ronald Teck

Member of the Colorado Senate from the 30th district
- In office January 8, 1975 – January 12, 1983
- Preceded by: Harry M. Locke
- Succeeded by: Dennis Gallagher

Member of the Colorado House of Representatives from the 55th district
- In office January 10, 1973 – January 8, 1975
- Preceded by: Phillip Massari
- Succeeded by: Paul Brown

Member of the Colorado House of Representatives from the 50th district
- In office January 13, 1971 – January 10, 1973
- Preceded by: Charles McCormick
- Succeeded by: Virginia Sears

Personal details
- Born: January 1, 1933 Colorado Springs, Colorado
- Died: June 16, 2019 (aged 86) Grand Junction, Colorado
- Party: Democratic

Tillie Bishop (January 1, 1933 – June 16, 2019) was an American politician who served in the Colorado House of Representatives from 1971 to 1975 and in the Colorado Senate from 1975 to 1999.

He died on June 16, 2019, in Grand Junction, Colorado at age 86.
