= Westminster Law School =

Law school in London, England

Coordinates: 51.5220°N 0.1549°W

- Parent school: University of Westminster
- Dean: Luke Mason
- Location: London, England, UK
- Website: www.westminster.ac.uk/wls

Westminster Law School (WLS) is the law school of the University of Westminster. Located at Little Titchfield Street near Regent Street in central London.

It awards LLB, LLM and PhD degrees, and also provides professional legal education including the Graduate Diploma in Law conversion course, the Legal Practice Course, for intending solicitors. It also offers numerous interdisciplinary courses and a BA in Policing.

== History ==
WLS was founded when Westminster gained university status in 1992. Professional legal training can be traced back to its antecedent institutes, the Holborn College of Law, Languages and Commerce, which was founded in 1960, and which was later designated the Polytechnic of Central London, until that in turn became the University of Westminster. The Law Faculty of the Polytechnic was located at Red Lion Square, London.

== Academic and professional courses ==
The school offers education at all levels of legal qualification, including a three-year undergraduate Bachelor of Laws (LLB) programme, a two-year Graduate Entry LLB degree programme, a one-year Masters of Law (LLM) and the Graduate Diploma in Law (GDL) course (formerly known as the Common Professional Examination).

The school teaches the Bar Professional Training Course (BPTC) for intending barristers, and the Legal Practice Course (LPC) for intending solicitors.

Students who successfully complete the BPTC or LPC are awarded a Postgraduate Diploma. The School provides both BPTC and LPC students with the ability to apply for an LL.M. degree with an additional dissertation to be completed over the summer.

== BPTC Association ==
The purpose of the BPTC Association is to provide parties and social activities for those students at Westminster Law School planning to qualify for the Bar. The School provides the BPTC Association with funds for the purpose of undertaking this task. All BPTC students are automatically members of the BPTC Association. The Committee Officers are the President, Vice President, Social Secretary and Treasurer, all of which are elected by the BPTC students.

== Student activities ==
Westminster Law Society is a student led society at the University of Westminster that caters for social and professional events aimed at both Law and non-Law students. It is one of the largest societies at the university.

The current Head of Westminster Law School is Professor Luke Mason. In 2016, Professor Lisa Webley, who teaches Empirical Legal Studies, was awarded the Law Teacher of the Year award. Professor Andreas Philippopoulos-Mihalopoulos and Professor Luke Mason of Westminster Law School have also previously won this award.
