= Shin Aitoku Maru =

Motor ship with wind-assisted propulsion built in 1980

Shin Aitoku Maru is an oil tanker which is considered the first commercial vessel to combine diesel engine propulsion with sail propulsion since the decline of traditional sailing cargo ships.

This solution was later adopted in the construction of further vessels.

== History ==
With the increase in fuel consumption due to the increased volume of cargo to be transported in the late 1970s, the question arose of evaluating additional propulsion systems that would allow for greater commercial speeds without increasing fuel consumption.

The concept behind the Shin Aitoku Maru was developed by Nippon Kokan in cooperation with the JAMDA (Japan Machinery Development Association); the boat was built in 1980 by the Imamura shipyard in Kure, Japan, and the vessel embarked on her maiden voyage on 1 August 1980.

The vessel was later renamed Nippo Maru in 1990 and, since 1994, has sailed under the Chinese flag as Yue you 129.

An additional seventeen vessels were built later, including the 26,000-ton Usuki Pioneer and the even larger Aqua City in 1984.

== Characteristics ==
With a deadweight of 1,475 tons, the vessel has two prominent polyester sails stretched over steel frames, which can be furled by wrapping them around their respective masts.

The navigation system used a logic unit then called a "microcomputer" that adjusted the angle of the square sails in real time to match the wind conditions and simultaneously reduced the power output of the ship's engines.

With this system the shipowner was able to save $50,000 a year in fuel costs: on its first commercial voyage it transported 1,400 tons of oil from the People's Republic of China to Japan, using 40% less fuel than comparable sized tankers.

== Sources ==
- Schlais, James F. (November 1981). Full sail ahead!. The Rotarian – via Google books.
- Sailing tanker "Shin Aitoku Maru". Japan Marine Machinery Development Association. 1983. ASIN B001OIC0UK.
- Risch, Helmut (1990). Windschiffe [Wind-powered ships] (Second ed.). Berlin: Verlag Technik. ISBN 3-341-00805-5.
