= MV Afros =

2018 Chinese-built wind-assisted bulk carrier

MV Afros is the world's first ultramax bulk carrier to be operable under wind-assisted propulsion. The vessel is managed by the Greek company Blue Planet Shipping.

== Technical data ==
The vessel is 199 metres (653 ft) long with a beam of 32 metres (105 ft) and was built in 2018. The MMSI is 538007531; Afros is registered in the Marshall Islands. Afros is assessed at 64,000 tons deadweight (DWT) and was built at Jiangsu Haitong Offshore Engineering Equipment shipyard in Rugao, China, becoming the first wind-assisted ultramax bulk carrier. The vessel is fitted with four Flettner rotors made by Anemoi Marine, which are mounted on rails on the deck, and can be moved aside during port operations.

== See also ==
- Cruise ferry Viking Grace which became the first passenger vessel with a rotor
- Liquid bulk tanker Maersk Pelican which was retrofitted with two rotors
