= Maersk Pelican =

Tanker ship

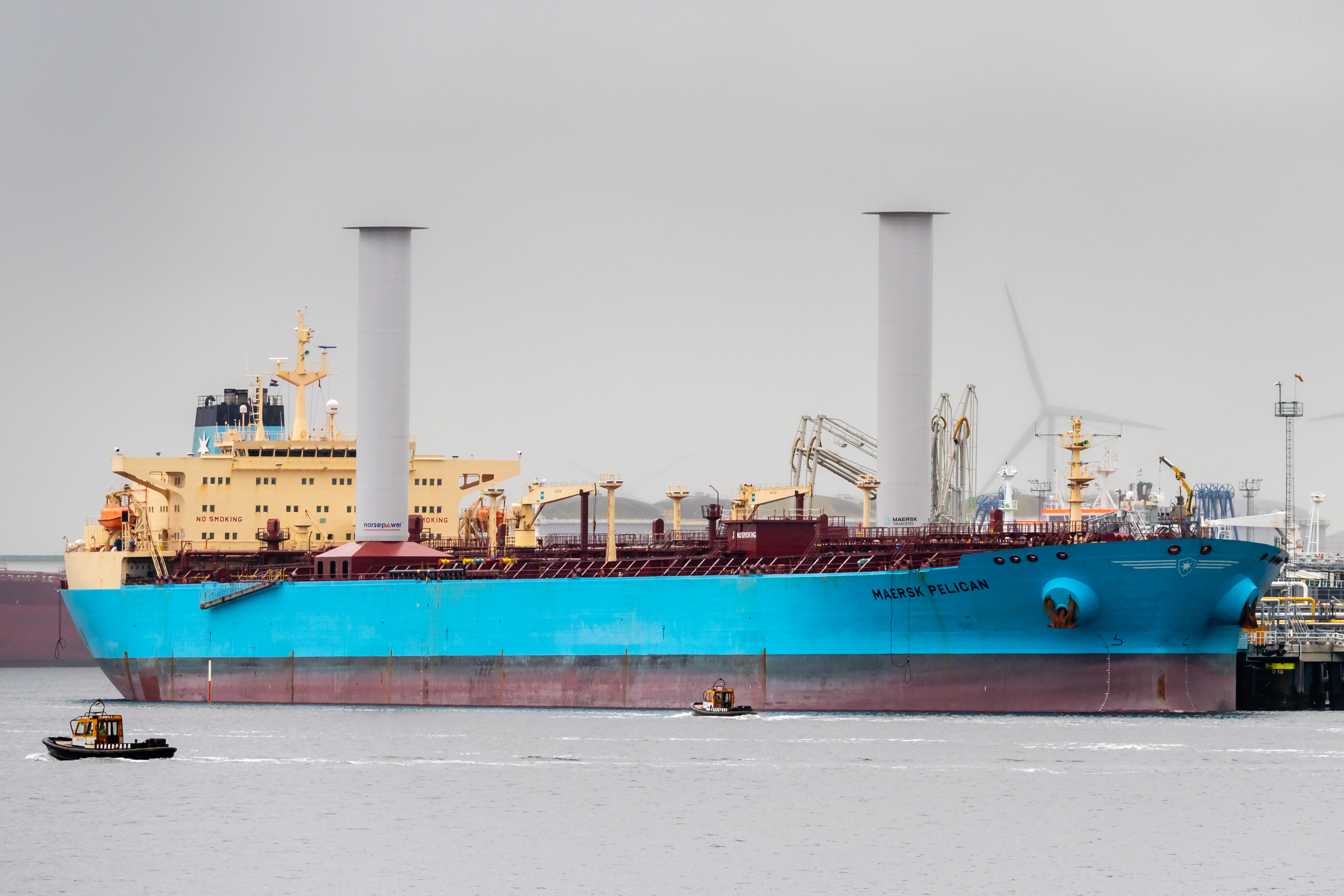

Maersk Pelican was a tanker ship which became the world's first tanker to be retrofitted with wind propulsion technology. Norsepower's rotor sails helped reduce fuel consumption by 8.2% during its trial period operating with Maersk. The vessel has since been sold and renamed multiple times. As of 2026, it is sanctioned as part of the Russian shadow fleet transporting Crude oil in circumvention of International sanctions during the Russian invasion of Ukraine.

== Technical details ==
The ship is 245 metres (803 ft 10 in) long and its MMSI number is 538009236. It was originally built in 2008. It was converted by installation of two vertical-axis cylindrical Flettner rotors in August 2018. Following the conversion, the ship was monitored by independent experts from Lloyd's Register's Ship Performance Group who arrived at the percentage fuel saving quoted. The rotor cylinders are 30 metres (98 ft) in height and five metres (16 ft) in diameter, and were installed on the vessel by Norsepower at Rotterdam.

== History and context ==
Maersk Pelican became the third commercial vessel to use rotor sail technology, after Estraden, a roll-on/roll-off (ro/ro) and general cargo bore vessel operating between the United Kingdom and Belgium, and Viking Grace, a cruise ferry.

In January 2021, Maersk sold Maersk Pelican, which was then renamed Timberwolf by its Indonesian purchaser.

Subsequently, towards reducing their carbon impact, Maersk plan to run more of their vessels on green methanol.

Norsepower have gone on to install rotors on bulk carriers, gas carriers, ro/ro ships, and passenger ships. They have opened a manufacturing facility at Dafeng, China.
