= Wind-assisted propulsion =

System for generating thrust for watercraft

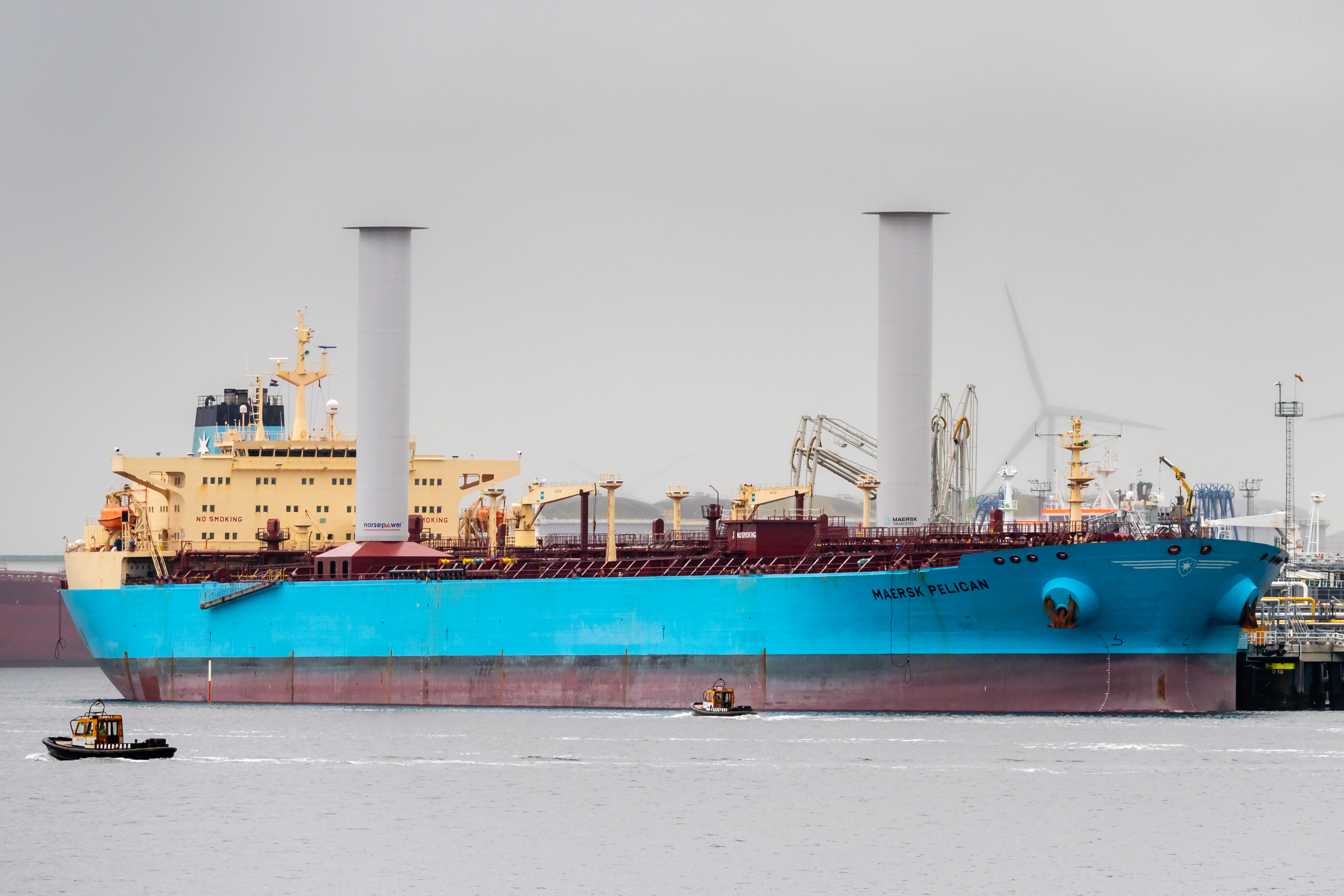
Maersk Pelican with Flettner rotors

Wind-assisted propulsion is the practice of decreasing the fuel consumption of a merchant vessel through the use of sails or some other wind capture device. Sails used to be the primary means of propelling ships, but with the advent of the steam engine and the diesel engine, sails came to be used for recreational sailing only. In recent years, increasing fuel costs and a greater focus on reducing greenhouse gas emissions, have increased interest in using wind to propel commercial ships.

A key barrier for the implementation of any decarbonisation technology and in particular of wind-assisted ones, is frequently discussed in the academia and the industry is the availability of capital. On the one hand, shipping lenders have been reducing their commitments overall while on the other hand, low-carbon newbuilds as well as retrofit projects entail higher-than-usual capital expenditure. Therefore, research effort is directed towards the development of shared economy and leasing business models, where benefits from reduced consumption of fossil fuels as well as gains from carbon allowances or reduced levies are shared among users, technology providers and operators.

== Design ==
The mechanical means of converting the kinetic energy of the wind into thrust for a ship is the subject of much recent study. Where early ships designed primarily for sailing were designed around the sails that propelled them, commercial ships are now designed largely around the cargo that they carry, requiring a large clear deck and minimal overhead rigging to facilitate cargo handling. Another design consideration in designing a sail propulsion system for a commercial ship is that for it to be economically advantageous it cannot require a significantly larger crew to operate and it cannot compromise the stability of the ship. Taking into account these design criteria, four main concepts have emerged as the leading designs for wind-assisted propulsion: the wing sail concept, the SolidSail systems, the kite sail and the Flettner rotor.

=== Wingsail ===
As a result of rising oil prices in the 1980s, the US government commissioned a study on the economic feasibility of using wind assisted propulsion to reduce the fuel consumption of ships in the US Merchant Marine. This study considered several designs and concluded that a wingsail would be the most effective. The wingsail option studied consisted of an automated system of large, often rectangular, solid sails supported by cylindrical masts. These would be symmetrical sails, which would allow a minimal amount of handling to maintain the sail orientation for different wind angles; however, this design was less efficient. A small freighter was outfitted with this system to evaluate its actual fuel gains, with the result that it was estimated to save between 15 and 25% of the vessel's fuel.

=== SolidSail ===
SolidSail is a wind propulsion technology designed for large vessels, developed by Chantiers de l'Atlantique in Saint-Nazaire, France. This system is based on rigid sails made of composite materials and a tilting gaff rigging, enabling hybrid or primary wind propulsion for commercial and cruise ships. Three SolidSail units are currently used for the propulsion systems of the longest sailing ship ever constructed (as of 2026), the Orient Express Corinthian, which is able to rely exclusively on its wind-powered propulsion in optimal conditions.

DynaRig

The DynaRig is a freestanding sailing rig with rotating masts and rigid yards which hold sails. The sails unfurl between the yards to form a sail on each mast. The angle to the wind is controlled by the rotating mast. The system has been developed for commercial vessels by North Windships and Southern Spars and has been used on sailing yachts such as Maltese Falcon and Black Pearl.

=== Kite sail ===
The kite sail concept has recently received a lot of interest. This rig consists of flying a gigantic kite from the bow of a ship using the traction developed by the kite to assist in pulling the ship through the water. Other concepts that have been explored were designed to have the kite rig alternately pull out and retract on a reel, driving a generator. The kite used in this setup is similar to the kites used by recreational kiteboarders, on a much larger scale. This design also allows users to expand its scale by flying multiple kites in a stacked arrangement.

The idea of using kites was, in 2012, the most popular form of wind-assisted propulsion on commercial ships, largely due to the low cost of retrofitting the system to existing ships, with minimal interference with existing structures. This system also allows a large amount of automation, using computer controls to determine the ideal kite angle and position. Using a kite allows the capture of wind at greater altitudes, where wind speed is higher and more consistent. This system has seen use on several ships, with the most notable in 2009 being MS Beluga Skysails, a merchant ship chartered by the US Military Sealift Command to evaluate the claims of efficiency and the feasibility of fitting this system to other ships.

=== Flettner rotor ===
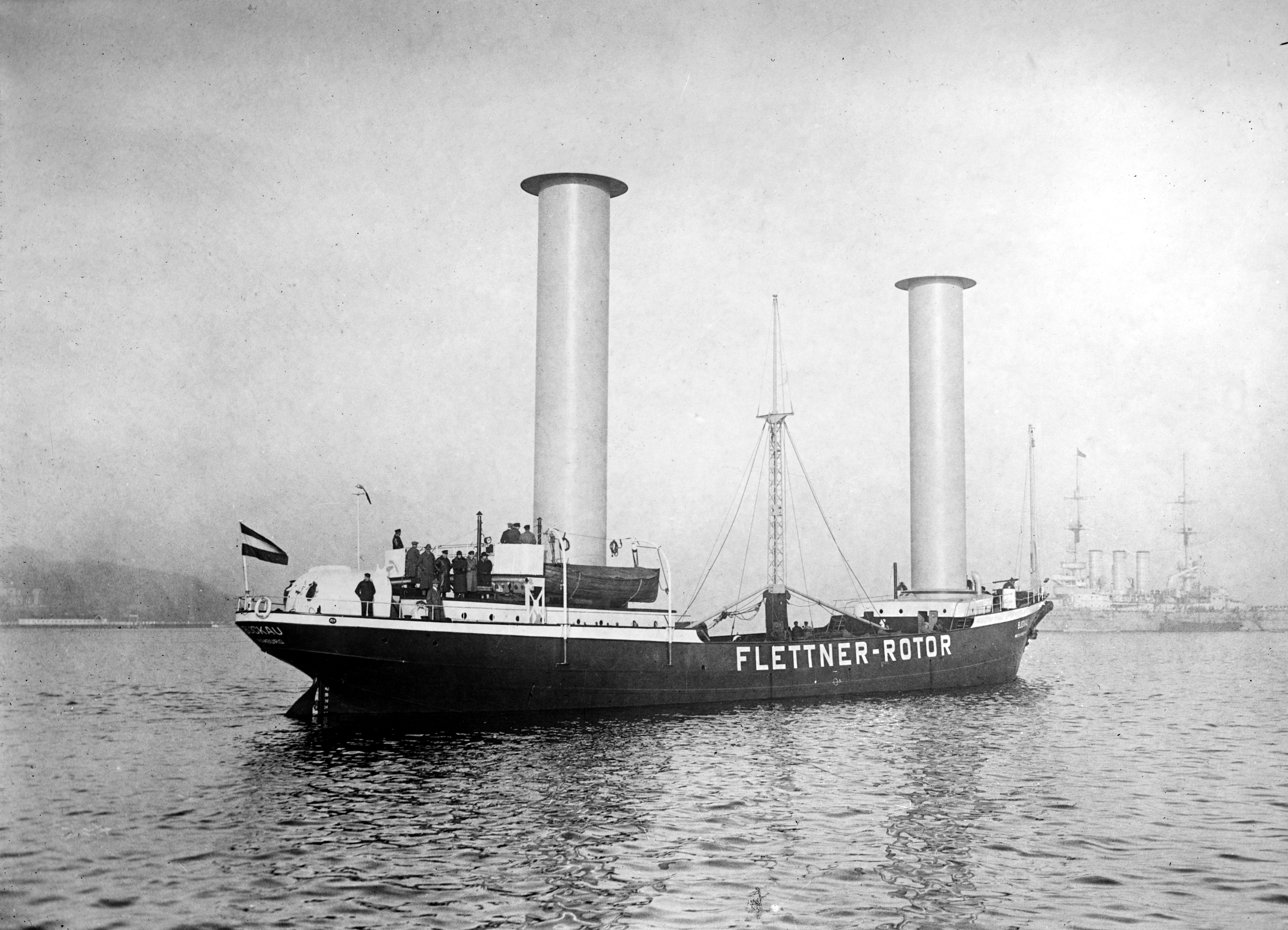
An early ship demonstrating the use of Flettner rotors

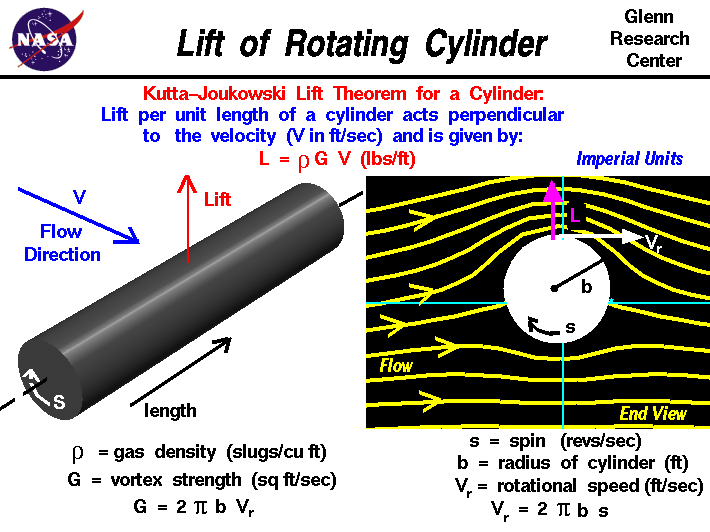
Diagram showing the operating principles of the Flettner rotor

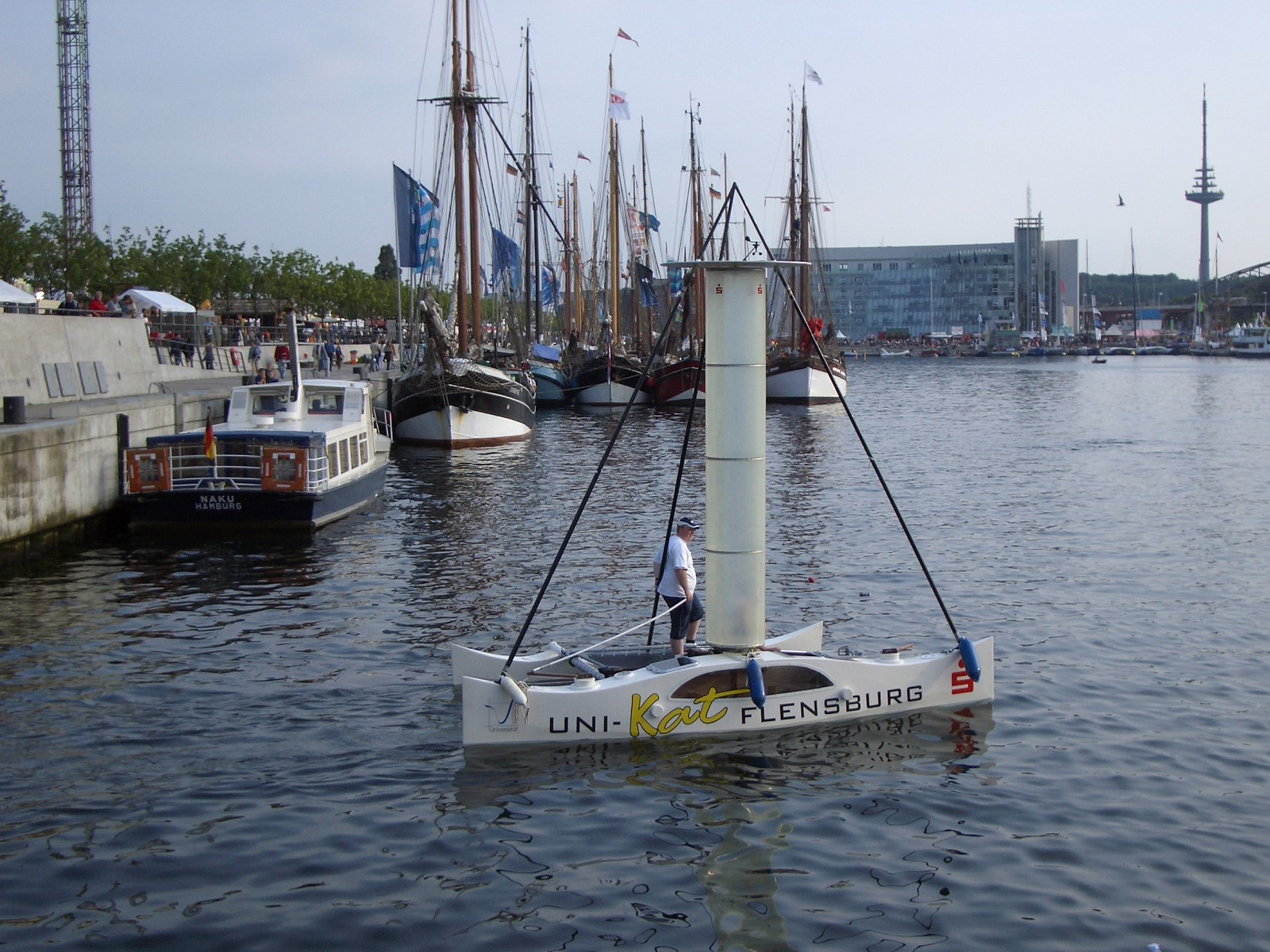
Flensburg catamaran at the Kiel Week 2007

The fourth design considered is the Flettner rotor. This is a large cylinder mounted upright on a ship's deck and mechanically spun. The effect of this spinning area in contact with the wind flowing around it creates a thrust effect that is used to propel the ship. Flettner rotors were invented in the 1920s and have seen limited use since then. In 2010 a 10,000 dwt cargo ship was equipped with four Flettner rotors to evaluate their role in increasing fuel efficiency. Since then, several cargo ships and a passenger ferry have been equipped with rotors.

The only parameter of the Flettner rotor requiring control is the rotational speed of the rotor, meaning this method of wind propulsion requires very little operator input. In comparison to kite sails, Flettner rotors often offer considerable efficiency gains when compared to the size of a sail or kite, versus the size of the rotor and prevailing wind conditions.

Examples of 2018 Flettner rotor installations include :

- Cruise ferry Viking Grace became the first passenger vessel with a rotor.
- The liquid bulk tanker Maersk Pelican was retrofitted with two rotors.
- The ultramax bulk carrier MV Afros received four rotors, which can be moved aside during port operations.

Three sister ships are built under charter to Airbus to move large aircraft sub-assemblies between its production sites in Europe and North America. Each ship has 6 rotors.

== Implementation ==
The efficiency gains of these three propulsion assistance mechanisms are typically around 15–20% depending on the size of the system. As of 2009, shipping companies had been hesitant to install untested equipment. As of 2019, several initiatives were looking into the feasibility of cost-effective wind propulsion for commercial ships, including the Swedish Oceanbird concept for using wing sails, the Japanese Wind Challenger Project, and several coordinating associations. By 2026, the Neoliner Origin cargo ship operates mainly on wind on its cross-Atlantic route.

== See also ==
- List of large sailing vessels

=== Vessels with wind-assistance (late C20 and onwards) ===
- Aqua City, a 1984 bulk carrier fitted with wind-propulsion technology
- Usuki Pioneer, a 1985 bulk carrier fitted with wind-propulsion technology
- Neoliner Origin, a sail-propelled ro-ro ferry with two SolidSail units designed for transatlantic trade
- Pyxis Ocean, a bulk carrier retrofitted with wind-propulsion technology
- Viking Grace, a rotor assisted cruise ship
- Wind Surf, a wind assisted cruise ship
- Ville de Bordeaux has eSails

=== Propulsion technologies ===
- Turbosail – Type of ship propulsion system
- DynaRig – Modern form of sailing ship rigging
- SolidSail – Novel propulsion system for large ships
- Hydrogen-powered ship
- Nuclear marine propulsion
- Internal drive propulsion
- Integrated electric propulsion
- Combined nuclear and steam propulsion
- Astern propulsion
- Marine propulsion
- Air-independent propulsion
