= Pyxis Ocean =

Wind-powered bulk carrier vessel

History
- Name: Pyxis Ocean
- Owner: Mitsubishi Corporation
- Port of registry: Singapore
- Completed: 2017
- Identification: 9798856
- Status: Active

General characteristics
- Type: Bulk carrier
- Tonnage: 43,291 tons
- Length: 229 m (751 ft)
- Beam: 32.26 m (105.8 ft)
- Draught: 8.6 m (28 ft)
- Sail plan: 2 foldable steel and fibreglass sails, each 37.5 m (123 ft) tall

Pyxis Ocean is a Kamsarmax bulk carrier vessel owned by Mitsubishi Corporation and fitted with wind-propulsion technology.

== History ==
The ship was built in 2017 and is flagged in Singapore.

In 2023 whilst chartered by Cargill, Pyxis Ocean was retrofitted with two 37.5 m (123 ft) tall 'WindWing' sails, a technology developed by the UK company BAR Technologies, manufactured by Yara Marine Technologies and added at a COSCO shipyard in Shanghai, China. Fitted to the deck, the foldable steel and fibreglass sails have been designed to help improve fuel consumption.

In August 2023, Pyxis Ocean set sail from Shanghai to Singapore on her maiden voyage. On 22 August 2023, she departed Singapore to sail to Brazil, during which monitoring of the WindWings's performance was to take place by the companies involved.

On 24 September 2023, Pyxis Ocean made her first docking at the Port of Paranaguá in Brazil and was loaded with soybean meal before a return sail to Poland.

== Description ==
The ship is 229 m (751 ft 4 in) long with a beam of 32.26 m (105.8 ft).

== See also ==
- Wind-assisted propulsion
