= Usuki Pioneer =

Usuki Pioneer was a bulk carrier that operated commercially with a combined engine and sail propulsion system between 1985 and 1995. In Japan, 17 ships were equipped with this propulsion system.

== Background ==
Following the decline of "classic" sailing cargo shipping, and in light of high bunker fuel prices during the oil crises of the mid-1970s and early 1980s, systems were developed worldwide to reduce fuel consumption on otherwise conventional cargo ships using sails.

In mid-1979, the Mini Daigo, a sailing motor vessel of only 83 GRT, was launched, successfully testing a similar sail system. This basic concept was further developed and implemented in 1980 on the considerably smaller sailing motor tanker Shin Aitoku Maru by Nippon Kokan in cooperation with JAMDA (Japan Machinery Development Association).

== History ==
Based on the experience gained, the Nakamura Steamship Company in Kobe commissioned the Japanese Usuki Tekkosho shipyard in Saiki in 1984 to build the Usuki Pioneer. The Usuki Pioneer was used for transporting timber and grain between Japan and the American West Coast. Its motor-sail operation was possible up to wind force 9 on the Beaufort scale and the ship operated in this way without significant problems until 1993. However, in a southeastern Chinese port, the sail system collided with port facilities. In 1995, the sail system was removed because the increasing maintenance and repair costs of the sails, combined with the lower fuel prices at the time, no longer allowed for efficient regular operation.

In 1987, the ship was renamed Swift Wings and, after several changes of ownership and name, sailed under the final name, Thepsupharat, from 2011 until being scrapped - its last position recorded by AIS dates from July 2013.

== Technical details ==
The ship was 162.5 metres (533 ft) length and 25.3 metres (83 ft) beam, and was fitted with a 6,500 metric horsepower (6,400 bhp) diesel motor driving two propellers.

== Sail Arrangement ==
The two sails were installed by N.K.K. The developed, automatically controlled, rigid but foldable JAMDA sails were mounted on two masts, one forward and one aft, and were expected to provide fuel savings of between 10 and 30 percent, depending on the route and wind. The results were better than expected, probably due to the improved roll damping.
