= Aqua City (ship) =

Aqua City was a bulk carrier that operated commercially with a combined engine and sail propulsion system from 1984 onwards.

== Background ==
Following the decline of "classic" sailing cargo shipping, and in light of high bunker fuel prices during the oil crises of the mid-1970s and early 1980s, systems were developed worldwide to reduce fuel consumption on otherwise conventional cargo ships using sails.

In mid-1979, the Mini Daigo, a sailing motor vessel of only 83 GRT, was launched, successfully testing a similar sail system. This basic concept was further developed and implemented in 1980 on the considerably smaller sailing motor tanker Shin Aitoku Maru by Nippon Kokan in cooperation with JAMDA (Japan Machinery Development Association).

== History ==
Based on the experience gained, the Aqua City was built in 1984 by the Japanese Nippon Kokan K.K. shipyard in Tsurumi. The mixed motor-sail operation was carried out for an extended period without any significant problems. However, in the 1990s, the sail system was dismantled because the increasing maintenance and repair requirements of the sails, combined with the lower bunker fuel prices at that time, no longer allowed for efficient regular operation.

In 1990, the ship was renamed Hua Tu, in 1997 Galvanic, in 2006 Merida, and finally in 2011 Wan Tai. After several changes of ownership and name, the ship was finally scrapped in September 2013.

== Sail Arrangement ==
The two automatically controlled, rigid, but foldable JAMDA sails, developed by N.K.K., were attached to two forward masts and were designed to provide fuel savings of between 10 and 30 percent.
