= Viking Grace =

Finnish cruise ship

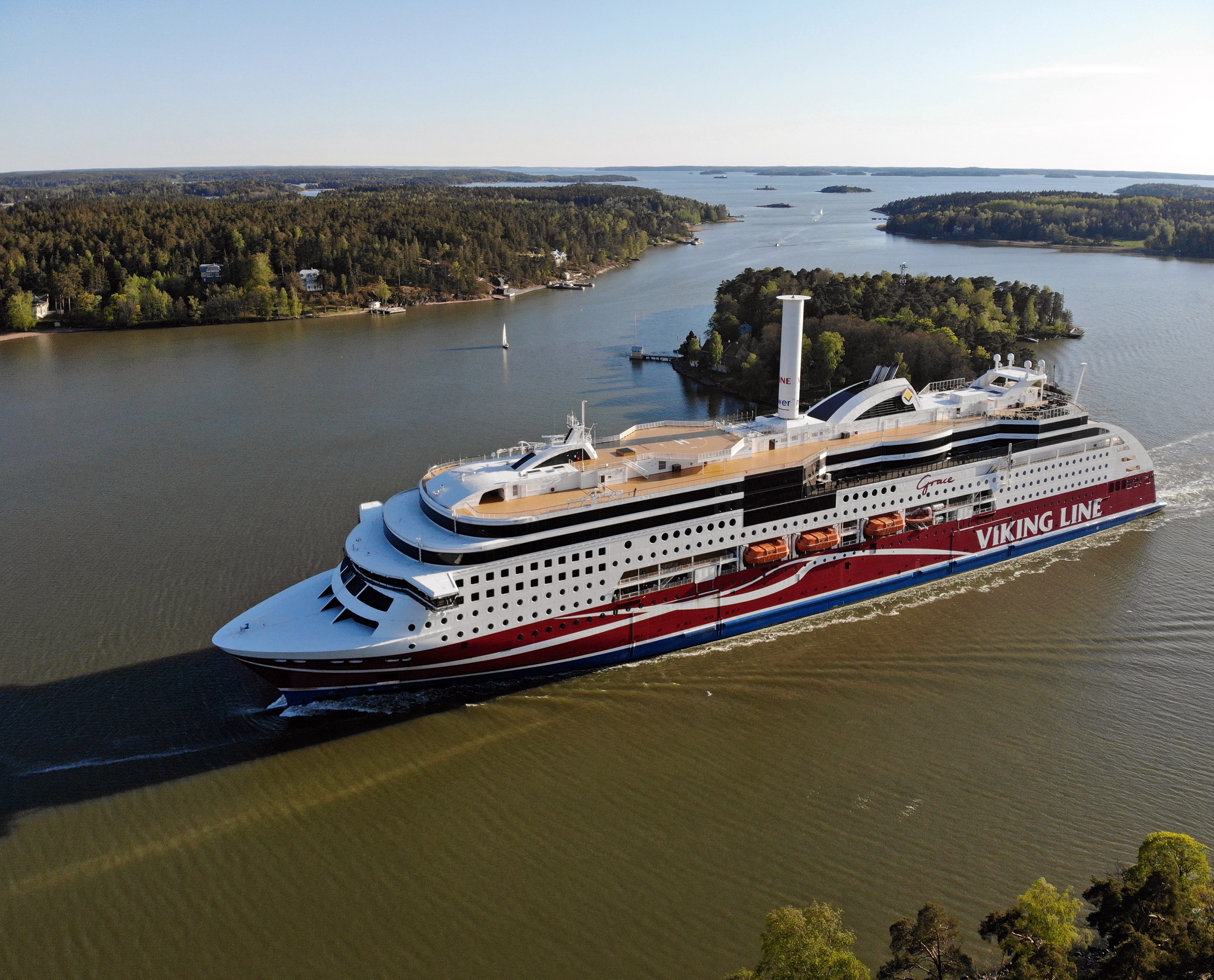
- Viking Grace

History

Finland
- Name: Viking Grace
- Owner: Viking Line
- Port of registry: Mariehamn, Finland
- Route: Turku–Mariehamn/Långnäs–Stockholm
- Ordered: 22 December 2010
- Builder: STX Europe Turku Shipyard, Finland
- Cost: 240 million euro (estimate)
- Yard number: 1376
- Laid down: 6 March 2012
- Launched: 10 August 2012
- Completed: 10 January 2013
- Maiden voyage: 13 January 2013
- In service: 2013–Present
- Identification: IMO number: 9606900; Call sign: OJPQ; MMSI number: 230629000
- Status: In service

General characteristics
- Type: Cruiseferry
- Tonnage: 57,565 GT
- Length: 218 m (715 ft 3 in)
- Beam: 31.8 m (104 ft 4 in)
- Ice class: 1 A Super
- Installed power: 4 × Wärtsilä 8L50DF (4 × 7,600 kW)
- Propulsion: Diesel-electric; Two shafts, fixed pitch propellers
- Speed: 22 knots (41 km/h; 25 mph)
- Capacity: 2,800 passengers; 1,275 lane meters for ro-ro cargo; 1,000 lane meters for cars
- Crew: 200

MS Viking Grace is a cruiseferry constructed at STX Europe Turku Shipyard, Finland for the Finland-based ferry company Viking Line. The ship was delivered to her owners on 10 January 2013, and entered service on 13 January 2013. She is the first large-scale passenger ferry to be powered by liquefied natural gas (LNG) as well as being fitted with a rotor sail.

Viking Grace replaced MS Isabella (now known as MS Isabelle) on the Turku-Långnäs-Stockholm route. Viking Grace is twinned by MS Viking Glory, which entered service in March 2022.

Viking Line and STX Finland made a contract of building the ship (shipyard project number NB 1376) on 25 October 2010, and the contract went into force on 22 December 2010. The contract price was about 240 million euro, and the ship was delivered in January 2013. The contract included an option of an additional ship. Constructing the ship took 2600 man-years.

Viking Grace has a length of 218 m (715 ft 3 in), beam of 31.8 m (104 ft 4 in) and maximum summer draft of 6.80 m (22 ft 4 in). The ship has a deadweight tonnage of 6,107 DWT and a gross tonnage of 57,565 GT, which gives maximum passenger capacity for 2,800 people. The vessel has 880 rooms, restaurants, bars, spa and shopping centers. MS Viking Grace also has 1,000 lane meters space for cars and 1,275 lane meters for storage of ro-ro cargo.

== Decks ==
Deck layout of MS Viking Grace

Deck 13
Helicopter deck.
Deck 12
Sun deck, outside deck bar open from May to August.

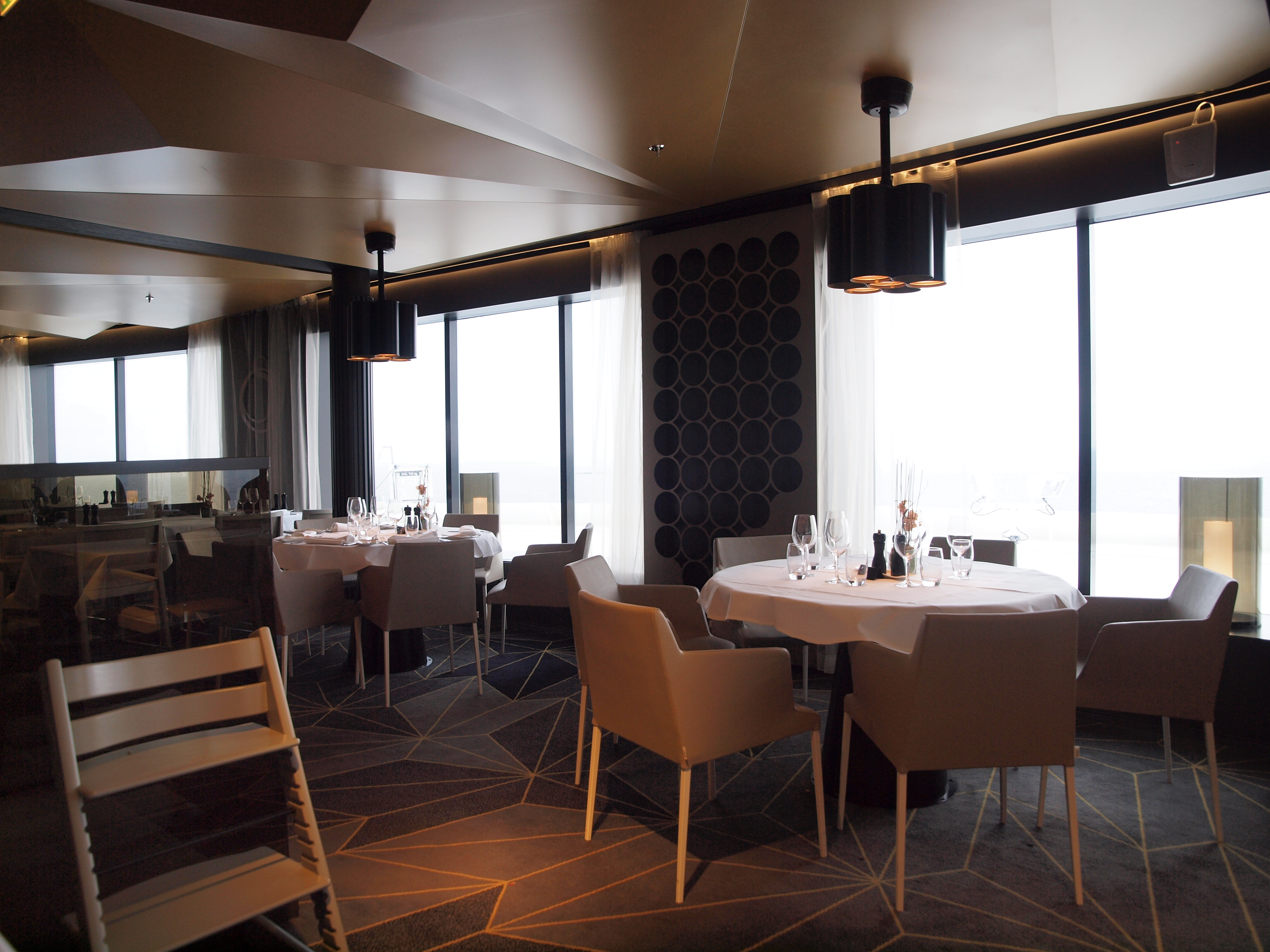
Restaurant Oscar à la carte

Deck 11
Oscar à la carte, Seamore Champagne Lounge, Wine Shop, Frank's Casual Dining, gaming room, children's play room, Spa Wellness and Club Vogue (upper level).

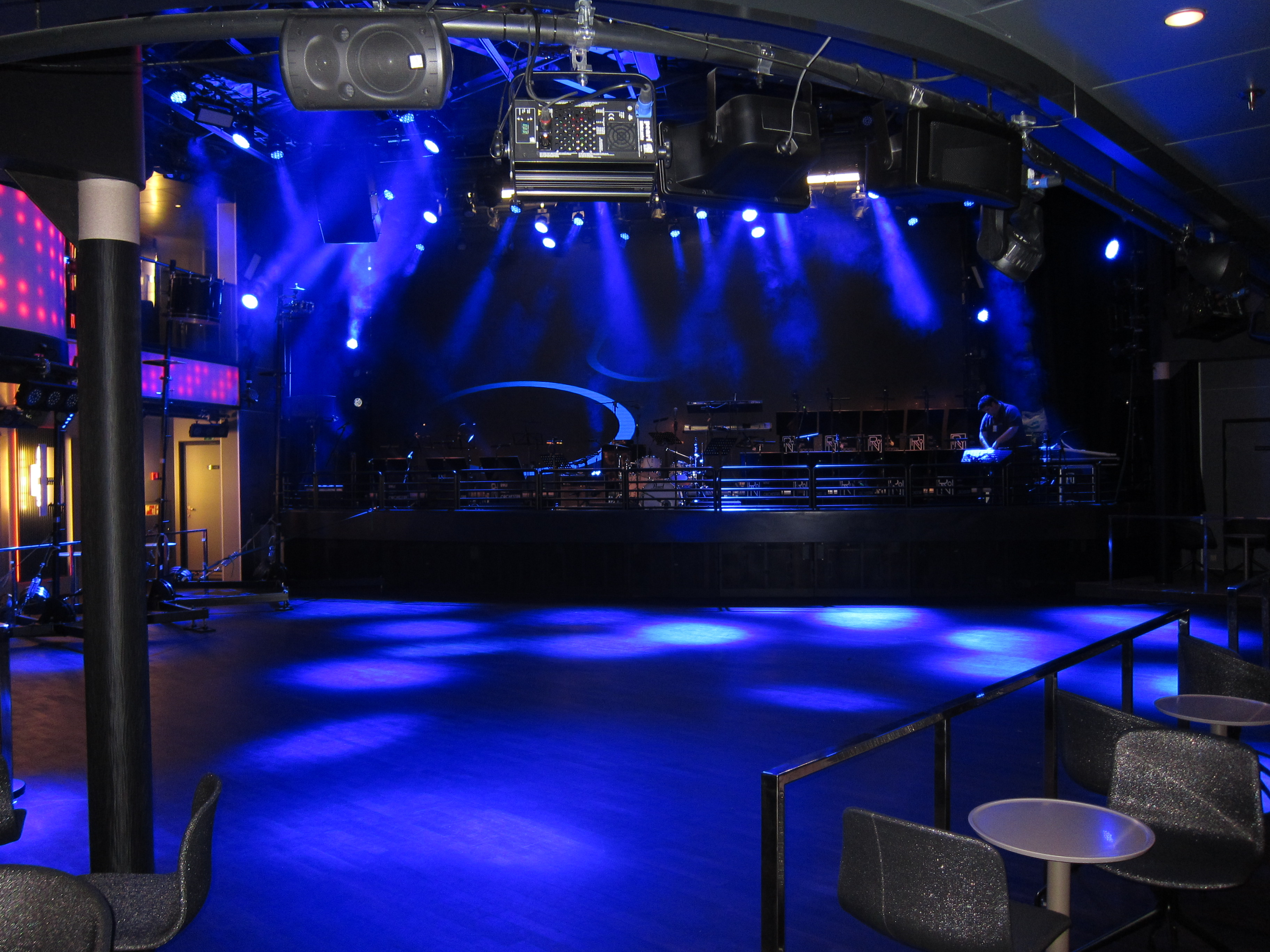
The Club Vogue night club

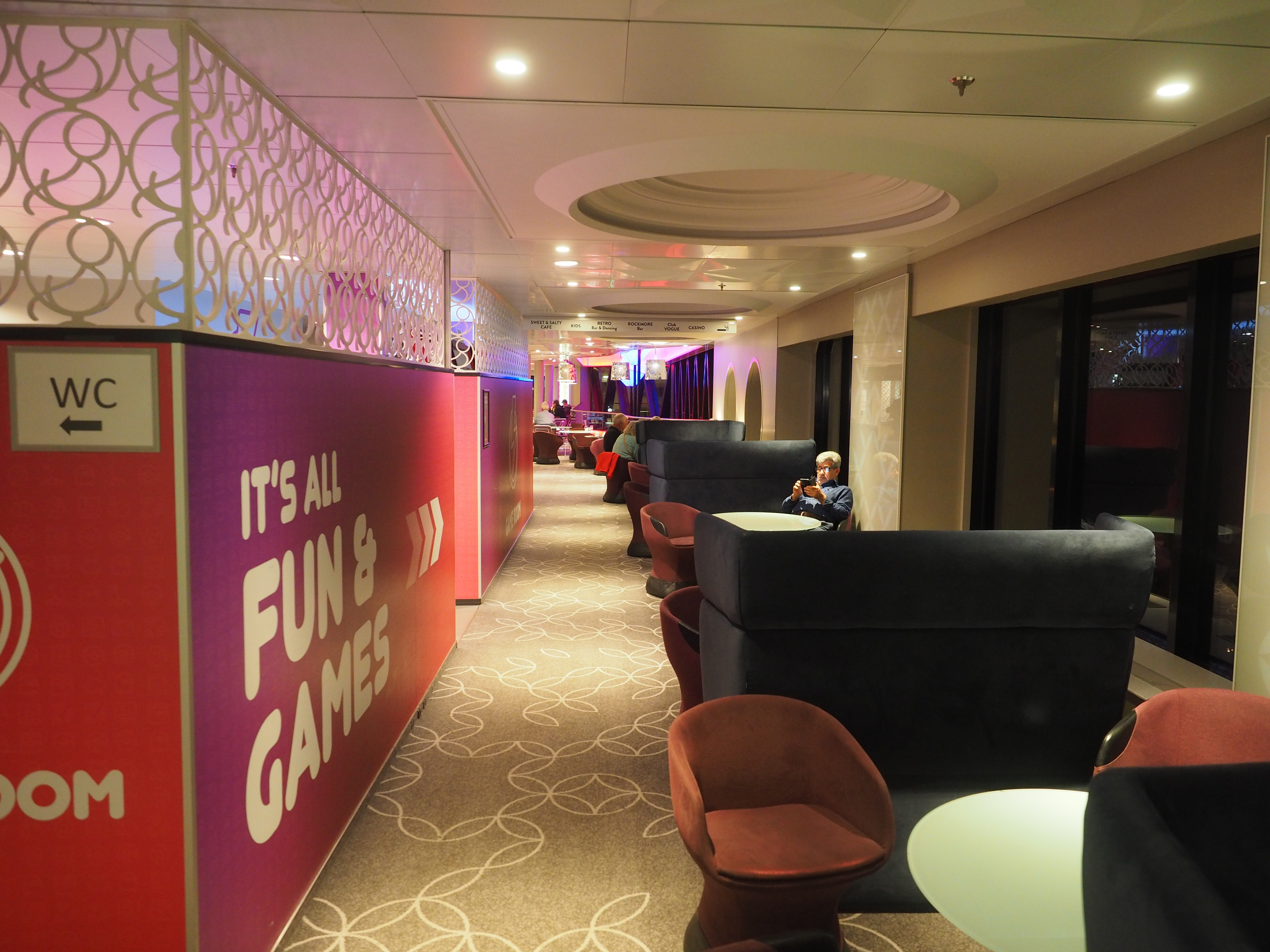
A corridor on deck 10

Deck 10
Buffet Aurora, Arcade, Sweet & Salty Café, Retro Bar & Dancing, Rockmore Bar, gaming room, children's play room, casino, sun deck and Club Vogue (lower level).
Deck 9
Shopping World duty free shop, Teens, gaming room, information desk, conference rooms, Victoria's Secret, bridge, café, cabins of classes PRM, ID2, SH3 and IP2.
Deck 8
Cabins of classes SU1, SU2, PRM, SD2, ID2, S4, I4, I2, IH4 and IP2.
Deck 7
Cabins of classes SU3, SU4, PRM, SD2, ID3, S4, I4, I2, IH4, S4R and I4R, embarkation and disembarkation.
Deck 6
Cabins of classes SD2, ID2, S4, I4, IH4, DH4, SH4, SF6 and IF6, embarkation and disembarkation.
Deck 5
Cabins of classes S4, I4, IP2 and Driver, car deck.
Deck 4
Car deck (for personal cars only, deck can be lifted up).
Deck 3
Car deck (for all cars).
Deck 2
Machinery room and crew quarters.
Deck 1
Machinery room and crew quarters.

== Cabins ==
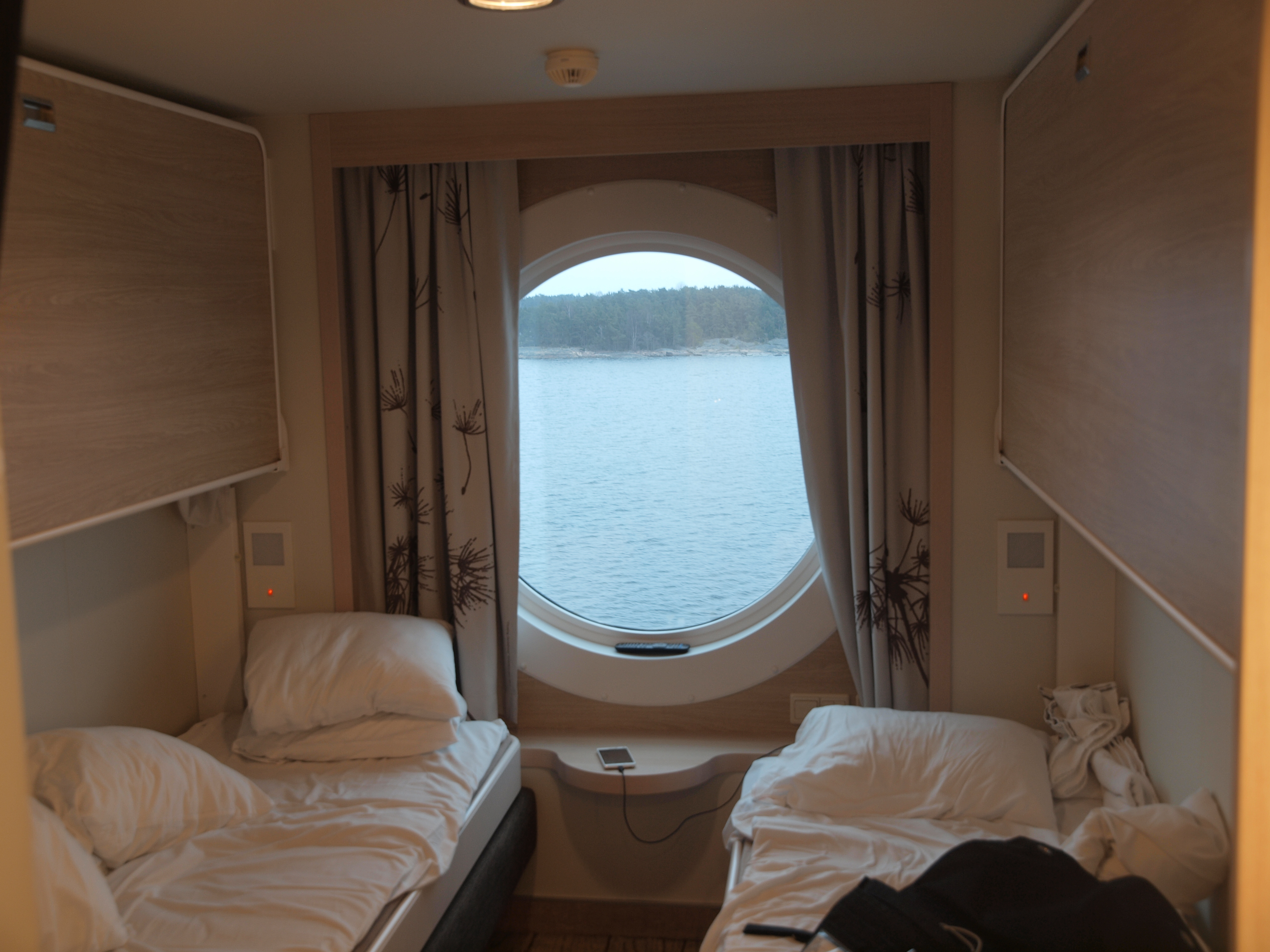
A cabin with a window, for four people

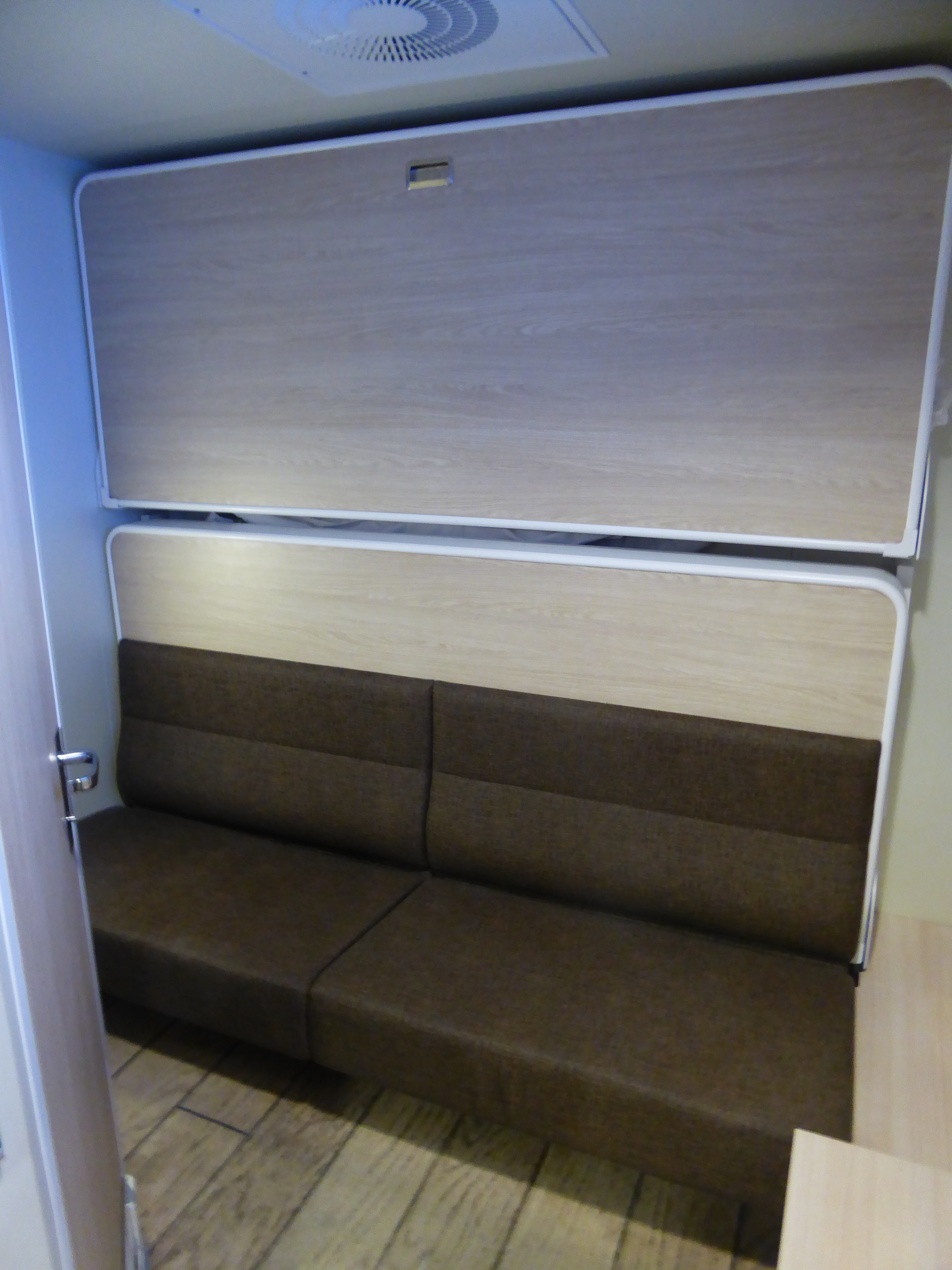
A cabin with a bunk bed with two people

With Viking Grace, Viking Line changed the class designations of the cabins from letter and number combinations to more descriptive names. The names have also since been changed on other Viking Line ships. All cabins have a toilet, a shower and a TV. Cabins for the disabled and suites have a doorway width of 89 cm, other cabins 64 cm.

Suite (SU1, SU2, SU3, SU4)
Four different suites with a double bed and a sofa bed with special breakfast for four people. Also a fridge with refreshments. Some suites also have a hot tub. Floor surface 41 to 45 m^{2}.
Premium (PRM)
A more classy cabin with a large window for four people with a double bed and a Sofa bed. A fridge with refreshments and a special breakfast are included in the price. Floor surface 13.8 m^{2}.
Seaside Double (SD2)
A spacious cabin with a window, for two people. A double bed. Floor surface 9.7 m^{2}.
Seaside Four (S4)
A cabin with a window, for four people. Two bunk beds with two levels each. Floor surface 9.4 to 9.7 m^{2}.
Seaside Four R (S4R)
A cabin with a window without a full-scale floor mat. Two bunk beds with two levels each. Floor surface 9.4 m^{2}.
Seaside Family (SF6)
A combination of two separate cabins for a maximum of six people (at least one adult and two children). An interior door. One cabin has a double bed and the other has two bunk beds with two levels each. Floor surface 19.4 m^{2}.
Inside Double (ID2)
A cabin without a window, for two people. A double bed. Floor surface 9.4 to 9.7 m^{2}.
Inside Double Three (ID3)
A cabin without a window, for three people. A double bed with an additional bed above it. Floor surface 9.7 m^{2}.
Inside Four (I4)
A cabin without a window, for four people. Two bunk beds with two levels each. Floor surface 9.4 to 9.7 m^{2}.
Inside Four R (I4R)
A cabin without a window, for four people, without a full-scale floor mat. Two bunk beds with two levels each. Floor surface 9.5 m^{2}.
Inside Two (I2)
A cabin without a window, for two people. Two separate beds. Floor surface 9.4 m^{2}.
Inside Family (IF6)
A combination of two separate cabins for a maximum of six people (at least one adult and two children). An interior door. One cabin has a double bed and the other has two bunk beds with two levels each. Floor surface 19.4 m^{2}.
Seaside HC Four (SH4)
A cabin with a window, for four people. Designed for the disabled. Two bunk beds with two levels each. Floor surface 17.5 m^{2}.
Inside HC Four (IH4)
A cabin without a window, for four people. Designed for the disabled. Two bunk beds with two levels each. Floor surface 14 m^{2}.
Double HC Four (DH4)
A cabin with a window, for four people. Designed for the disabled. One double bed and one bunk bed. Floor surface 19.1 m^{2}.
Seaside HC Three (SH3)
A cabin with a window, for three people. Designed for the disabled. A bunk bed with two lower beds and one upper bed. Floor surface 12.2 to 12.8 m^{2}.
Inside Piccolo Two (IP2)
A small cabin without a window, for two people. One bunk bed. Floor surface 5.5 m^{2}.
Driver
A small cabin without a window, for two people. One bunk bed. Floor surface 5.4 m^{2}.

== Background ==
Viking Line had been planning new ships on the route from Turku to Stockholm for a long time. The route had been trafficked by the ships MS Isabella and MS Amorella, both built in the late 1980s.

Viking Line designed advanced technical solutions for the Turku - Mariehamn - Stockholm route. According to the chief technical officer Kaj Jansson, the intent was to design fast ships with narrow hulls, which would travel lightly in the water and whose environmental effects would be minimal.

Viking Line was already in negotiations in 2009 with the Finnish natural gas company Gasum about using LNG as fuel for the new ship. Viking Line's CEO at the time Nils-Erik Eklund said that LNG was the fuel of the future in ship traffic and that Viking Line had been investigating it for a long time. Still in 2009 Eklund declined to comment whether the new ship would use LNG, one of the reasons being the development of its price. Still he emphasised that LNG would offer significant ecological benefits. For the use of LNG, a new LNG terminal would be built in Naantali or in the Pansio harbour area in Turku.

In January 2010 Mikael Backman said that Viking Line was in negotiations with nine shipyards. Answers for the offer requests were awaited during the spring. In the same interview Backman said that Viking Line would decide on the order during 2010. He emphasised that it was not the intent to build a ship similar to MS Amorella but instead a fully different, significantly larger ship. Making larger ships would also cause renovation work with Viking Line's Turku and Stockholm terminals so they could handle increased passenger traffic. The second level of the Turku terminal would be expanded, the passenger bridges would be elevated and the harbour would possibly have a new parking house. Backman also said that Viking Line would be happy to choose the Turku shipyard, even if the price was higher than with competing shipyards. However, supports received by competing shipyards gave them an advantage in the pricing contest.

On 3 June 2010 Viking Line announced that it had not received a satisfactory answer from the shipyards it had left an offer request at. Particularly the Turku shipyard took this announcement gravely, because Viking Line had in practice two options: order the ship from the Turku shipyard or do not order it at all. According to estimates, Viking Line would have had a great defeat in its image had it ordered the ship from abroad. The new ship order would still not have fulfilled the capacity of the Turku shipyard after it had finished its latest order at the time, Allure of the Seas in October 2010, but would still have kept it in action and its subcontractors working. According to Backman, the ships would still be ordered, but he also said that there was no information on how far the order would be delayed.

According to Viking Line, the price was nowhere near right on any of the shipyards. Because of the practically nonexistent demands of the shipyards the order prices should have been reasonable, and the government support package should have levelled the price differences between the parties. Viking Line needed new ships to replace the old ones, and the contest between the ship companies should have favoured ship orders. Still, no order was made at the time.

In June 2010 Mikael Backman said Viking Line had left a new offer to STX Finland. Two shipyards were left in the negotiations at the time.

On 25 October 2010 Viking Line and STX Finland drew up a contract to build the ship. According to Viking Line the contract still depended on environmental support from the Finnish state. On 26 October 2010 no decision to support Viking Line's ship order was made in the additional budget negotiations of the Finnish government. According to Prime Minister of Finland Mari Kiviniemi a provision to give the support would be extended to 2011, but possible decisions would be made in an economic-political minister board. The CEO of STX Finland Juha Heikinheimo said that conceptual design work of the ship had already been going on for a long time. According to him, the proper design work started as soon as the contract was signed. Viking Line was also in negotiations with Gasum about providing the gas to Turku and Stockholm. The ship order also depended on the result of the negotiations with Gasum.

On 21 December 2010 the financial board of the Finnish government supported the environmental support decision of the ministry of traffic and communications. A support grant of 28 million euro was given to Viking Line for investments to improve the environmental protection of the ships, meaning to build a new ship. The support program still required acceptance from the European Commission for Viking Line's support request. The support would be given to Viking Line after the ship had been delivered and added to the merchant ship list, however in 2012 at the earliest.

On the next day 22 December Viking Line and STX Finland announced that the ship building contract had entered into force. Conditions in the contract included getting environmental support. Backman also said that Viking Line was in negotiations about getting fuel for the new ship with three Finnish companies and the Swedish company AGA AB.

== Design and construction ==
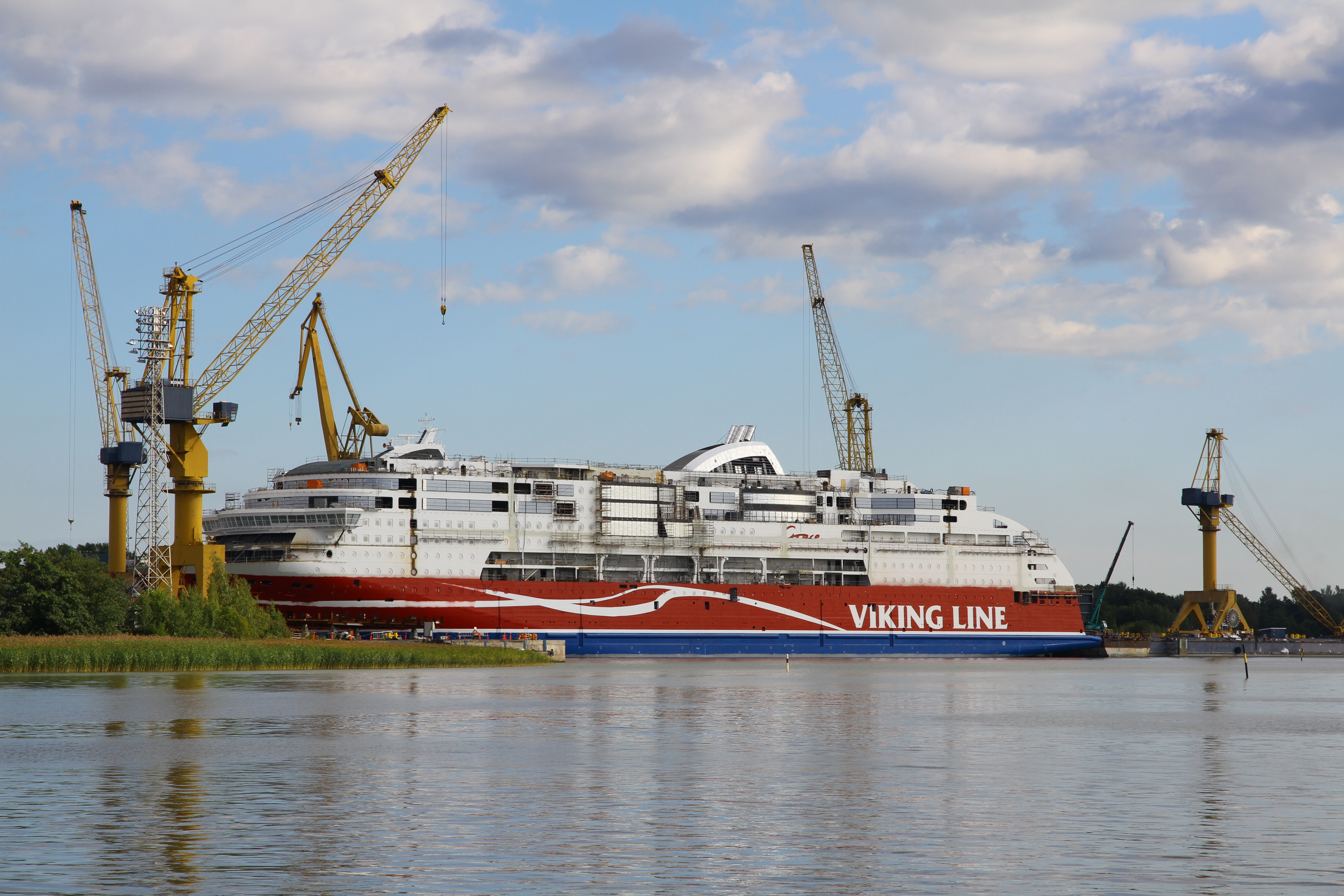
MS Viking Grace at the equipment bay of the Perno shipyard on 11 August 2012

Construction of the hull of the ship started on the Turku shipyard on 28 September 2011 when Viking Line's CEO Mikael Backman started the steel production for the ship. A contest was held for the ship's name during the change of the year from 2011 to 2012, and Viking Line's board chose Viking Grace as the winner on 17 February 2012. According to the company, the name represents style, design and feeling. Her keel was laid on 6 March 2012, where her keel was lowered onto nine euro coins struck in 2012. The coins belong the Suomenlinna commemorative series and include the entire run of euro coins (€2, €1, 50 c, 20 c, 10 c, 5 c, 2 c and 1 c) and the Suomenlinna commemorative coin. When the hull was complete and the ship was ready to be launched, the coins were picked up and welded onto the ship's mast. Viking Line announced on 10 May 2012 that it is not going to order a sister ship for Viking Grace, so she will probably remain as a unique vessel in the company's fleet. Viking Grace was launched from the Turku shipyard on Friday 10 August. Filling the shipyard pool was started on 10 August 2012, but the water was only filled up to the top of the support pillars at first, in order to check the ship's watertightness. At noon on 11 August 2012 the ship was moved to the equipment bay.

During the night from 22 to 23 November 2012 a water damage was found on the ship, resulting from a failure in a cargo valve. This caused one of the machinery compartments to flood with one metre of water. The water was quickly pumped out of the ship after the ship's own firemen found the leak during the night, and the ship suffered no damage.

=== Features ===
Viking Grace claims to be the most environment-friendly of all large cruiseferries. She uses liquefied natural gas (LNG) and diesel as fuel, reducing emissions to the air when compared with solely diesel. The intent is to be able to refuel the ship with LNG from both Turku and Stockholm. The ship can travel two to three days with one refuelling. Also the ship's wave forming and noise have been kept to a minimum as it has been designed to travel in an archipelago.

According to Viking Line's CEO Mikael Backman the Viking Grace has the largest panorama windows on the Baltic Sea cruiseferries. The common spaces of the ship are on the sides, and they offer wide views out onto the sea.

=== Engine ===
Viking Grace is driven by four diesel/gas Wärtsilä 8L50DF electric engines, each with power of 10,100 HP, and was the first LNG-powered passenger ship.

=== Rotor sail ===
Viking Grace is the first modern passenger ship to be fitted with a rotor sail, which allows for hybrid usage of LNG and wind power. The technology, called Rotor Sail Solution, was developed by the Finnish company Norsepower and has produced a fuel saving of up to 20% in favourable wind conditions. The rotor sail was first used on a voyage from Turku to Stockholm on 12 April 2018.

The rotor cylinder has a height of 24.00 m and a width of 4.00 m. During operation, the cylinder is rotated by shipboard motors and creates thrust from the ambient airflow via the Magnus effect. This form of propulsion was developed and patented by the German engineer Anton Flettner in 1922.

The rotor sail was removed during maintenance operations in 2021. According to the information officer of Viking Line it is difficult to estimate the sail's effect on LNG consumption, because conditions on the sea vary from day to day.

== Maiden voyage ==
The ship's maiden voyage was from 13 to 15 January 2013. Viking Line sold all inclusive packages to the cruise, covering a cabin, food, drinks and special programs. The ship was christened before the cruise started. The cruise was sold out in four hours, with prices starting from 350 euro per bed, and by Christmas time 2012 Viking Line had sold 300 thousand voyages. In addition to regular passengers, passengers on the cruise included directors and board members of Viking Line and invited guests.

== Incidents ==
On 21 November 2020, Viking Grace ran aground while attempting to dock at Mariehamn en route from Stockholm to Turku. (Note: The ship was travelling from Stockholm to Turku, not from Turku to Stockholm as it says in the cited BBC article.) The ship was towed into the harbour overnight and the 331 passengers and 98 crew, who had slept on board, were evacuated later that morning. No investigation was started about the incident.
