= Monarch Airlines =

Airline of the United Kingdom (1967–2017)

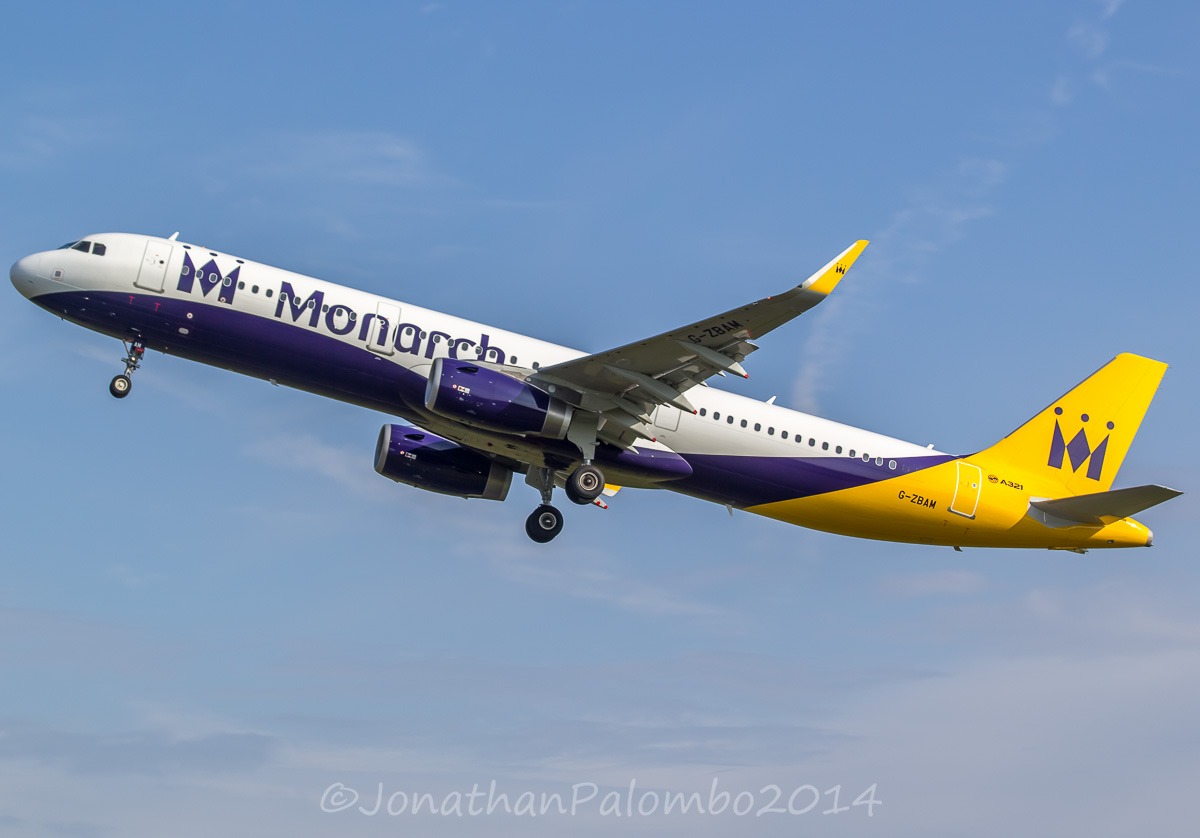
- Airbus A321
IATA	ICAO	Call sign
ZB	MON	MONARCH
- Founded: 5 June 1967
- Commenced operations: 5 April 1968
- Ceased operations: 2 October 2017
- AOC #: 365
- Operating bases: Birmingham; Leeds/Bradford; London–Gatwick; London–Luton; Manchester
- Frequent-flyer program: Vantage Club
- Fleet size: 35 (at closure)
- Destinations: 43 (at closure)
- Parent company: Monarch Airlines Holdings
- Headquarters: Prospect House, Luton, England, United Kingdom
- Key people: Andrew Swaffield (CEO)
- Founders: Bill Hodgson; Don Peacock
- Employees: 2,300 (at closure)

Monarch Airlines, simply known as Monarch, was a British charter and scheduled airline founded by Bill Hodgson and Don Peacock and financed by the Swiss Sergio Mantegazza family. The company later became a low-cost airline in 2004 before abandoning charter flying completely. The airline's headquarters were based at London–Luton, and it had operating bases at Birmingham, Leeds/Bradford, London–Gatwick and Manchester.

When Monarch entered administration in 2017, it was the biggest airline collapse in UK history up to that point, leaving nearly 100,000 passengers and holidaymakers stranded. (Note: Two years later, on 23 September 2019, Thomas Cook collapsed, leaving 150,000 people stranded, and became the largest UK airline ever to collapse.) The airline held a United Kingdom Civil Aviation Authority (CAA) Type A Operating Licence. This licence allowed Monarch to carry passengers, cargo, and mail on aircraft with 20 or more seats.

== History ==
=== 1960s ===
On 5 June 1967, Monarch Airlines was established by a pair of British businessmen, Bill Hodgson and Don Peacock, both of whom had previously been directors at the airline British Eagle. Unlike typical airlines at the time, Monarch was founded with the express intent of conveying British holidaymakers to tourism hotspots and desirable getaway destinations throughout Europe. Particularly at a time when air travel was traditionally feasible only to the rich, Monarch took another unusual step. The airline's ambition was to promote the service towards the demands and needs of the average family, rather than it being marketed solely for wealthier clients.

The business was operated as a subsidiary of Globus Getaway Holdings and received financial backing from the Swiss Sergio Mantegazza family. At the time of Monarch's inception, the Mantegazza family were the owners of UK-based tour operator Cosmos Tours. Sister company Engineering Limited (which would later become Monarch Aircraft Engineering Limited) performed maintenance on the company's aircraft. On 5 April 1968, Monarch commenced commercial airline operations. Monarch conducted a charter flight from Luton Airport to Madrid, Spain, using a Bristol Britannia 312.

The airline's initial fleet comprised a pair of Bristol Britannias (both ex-Caledonian Airways) serviced in a single hangar at Luton. During 1969, the firm's second year of operation, Monarch was able to acquire additional Britannias from the administrators of troubled airline British Eagle. Shortly after, the airliner reached a milestone in the form of 250,000 passengers carried within a 12-month period, which at that point was operating an expanded fleet of six Britannias.

=== 1970s ===
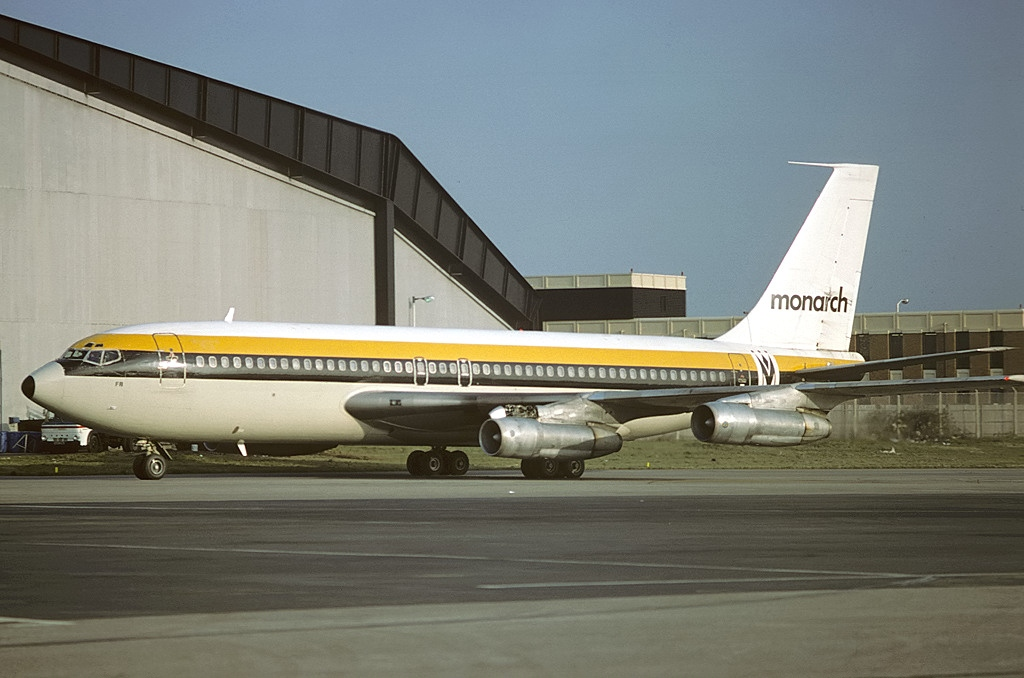
Boeing 720, in the livery of the 1970s, at London Luton Airport in 1979

During 1971, Monarch added three Boeing 720Bs to its fleet. The airline's first commercial jet service took to the air on 13 December 1971.

By the 1970s, there was a strong demand amongst the wider British population for the package holiday format, to which Monarch was able to capitalise upon greatly. During 1972, the airline recorded having carried 500,000 passengers with the space of a single year for the first time. However, during the 1970s energy crisis, in which the price of oil spiked dramatically, many airlines experienced periods of considerable financial hardship. One of Monarch's rivals in the package holiday sector, Court Line, was forced into receivership. While the company took on several former staff from Court Line, Monarch itself was not immune to these difficulties either.

The final passenger flight by a Monarch Britannia was on 9 October 1974, leaving an all-jet fleet composed of Boeing 720Bs and BAC One-Eleven 500s.

=== 1980s ===
Monarch Airlines 1980s logo

At the end of 1980, Monarch Airlines took delivery of its first new jet aircraft, a pair of Boeing 737-200 Advanced. Monarch acquired the aircraft on an operating lease from Bavaria Leasing (then a unit of Hapag Lloyd Airlines). One of the newly delivered 737s operated from Tegel Airport in then West Berlin (in the days before the German reunification) at the beginning of the 1981 summer season. The Berlin-based aircraft operated short to medium-haul charter flights to the Mediterranean and the Canary Islands under contract to Flug-Union Berlin, at the time one of West Berlin's leading package tour operators. Monarch had taken over Flug-Union Berlin's charter programme from Laker Airways. The addition of the 737s expanded Monarch's fleet to 11 jet aircraft, comprising one Boeing 707-320C, five Boeing 720Bs, three BAC One-Eleven 500s and two Boeing 737-200 Advs.

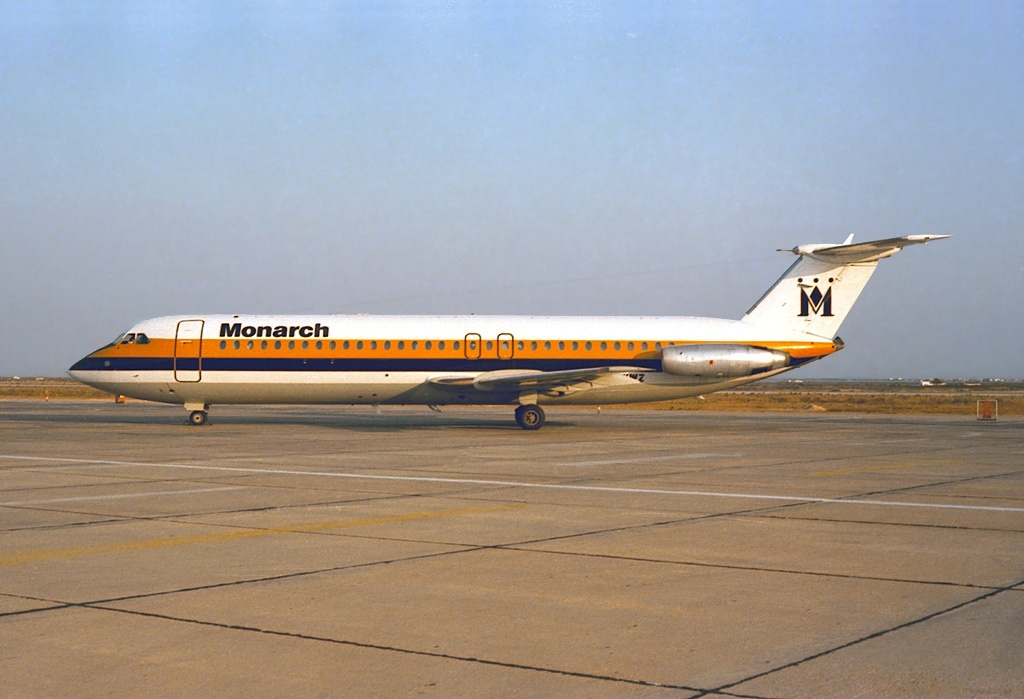
BAC 1-11 at Faro Airport in 1986

During 1981, new stations opened at Gatwick, Glasgow, Manchester and Berlin Tegel making it the first time Monarch Airlines carried a million passengers in a single year. 1981 was also the year Monarch became the first charter airline to order the Boeing 757-200, a high-capacity medium-haul single-aisle plane powered by Rolls-Royce RB211-535C engines. Monarch's 757 order represented a significant change for a small airline. The first delivered 757 entered service in the spring of 1983, coinciding with the introduction of an updated livery, the third in the airline's history. During the mid-1980s, sister company Monarch Aircraft Engineering Limited opened several new facilities at Luton to expand the firm's maintenance capabilities. Amongst other things, it enabled the 757 fleet to be maintained in-house.

During spring 1985, the Civil Aviation Authority (CAA) awarded Monarch licences to commence scheduled services to Málaga, Menorca and Tenerife. These licences allowed the airline to launch its first-ever scheduled service from Luton to Menorca on 5 July 1986, under the brand name "Monarch crown service". This event signified the first time in which Monarch was in direct competition with rival airlines, rather than just as a component of a tour operator.

During 1986, Monarch acquired their first Boeing 737-300 airliner. From November 1988, four of Monarch's 737-300s were leased out to Euroberlin France, a Berlin Tegel-based Franco-German joint venture airline that was 51% owned by Air France and 49% by Lufthansa. Apart from the aircraft itself, Monarch Airlines also provided the flight deck crew and maintenance support (through sister company Monarch Aircraft Engineering) for this airline. By 1990, seven 737-300s are assigned to the Euroberlin wet lease.

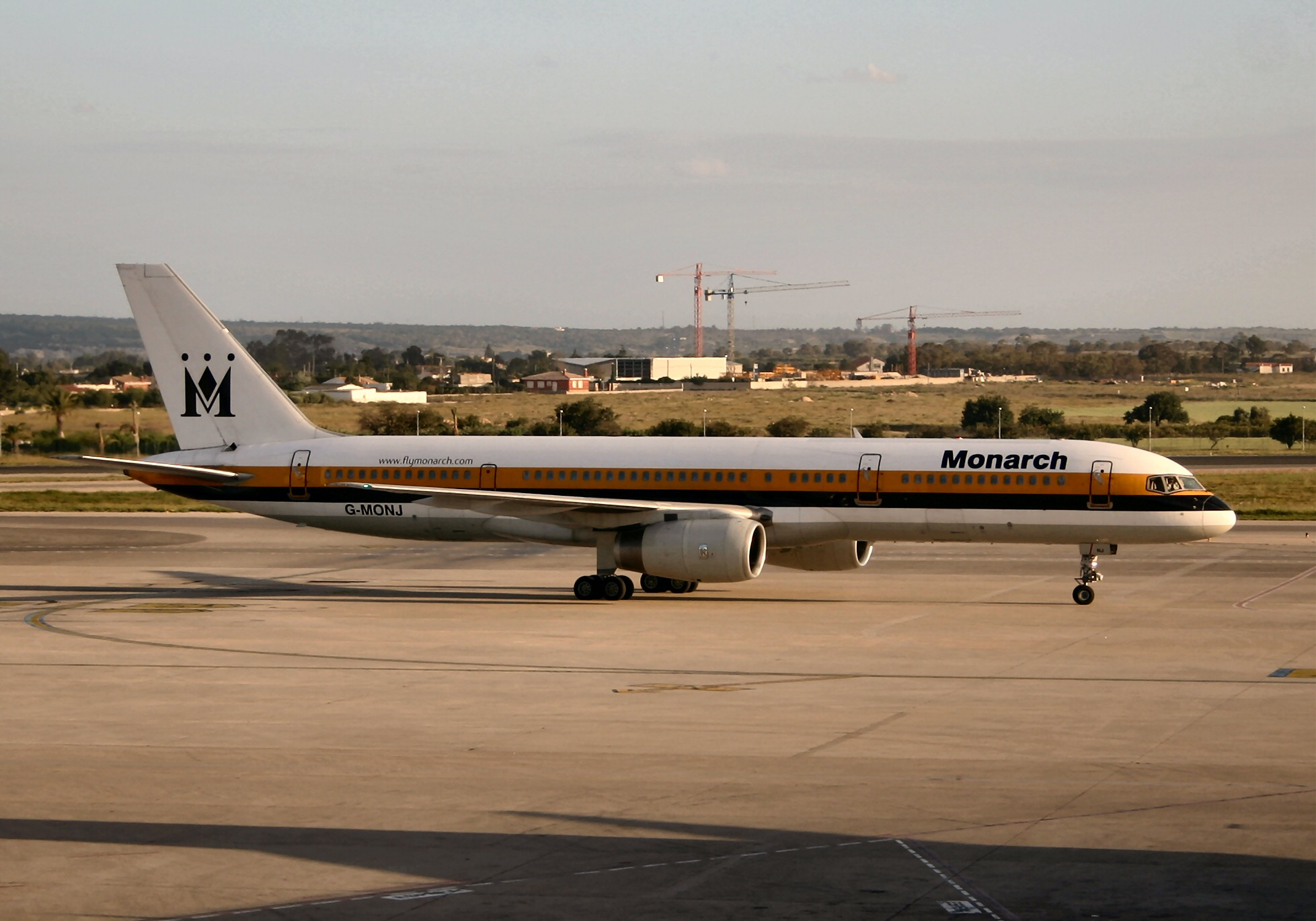
Boeing 757-200 at Alicante Airport, Spain

On 1 May 1988, Monarch operated the first ETOPS Transatlantic operation under CAA regulations. The Boeing 757-200ER G-MONJ operated Luton to Orlando via Gander with 235 passengers. This operation became the first British-operated twin-jet ever to cross the North Atlantic with passengers. Since then, this feat has become commonplace for North Atlantic crossings. That same year, Monarch Airlines reached another milestone; the firm carried more than two million passengers within a year.

In 1989 into 1990, Monarch damp leased two Boeing 757 aircraft (G-DRJC and G-MOND) to Australian Airlines (TN) during a pilots' strike. These aircraft were crewed by Monarch pilots with Australian Airlines Flight Attendants and served primarily on east-coast services.

=== 1990s ===
In 1990, Monarch introduced the Airbus A300-600R, its first wide-body aircraft type. Monarch also opened a new purpose-built headquarters that housed the airline's Boeing 757 flight simulator at its Luton base. During the early 1990s, the company operated several Boeing 767-300ER wide-body aircraft on behalf of Alitalia Team, a subsidiary of Italy's flag carrier, under a wet-lease arrangement similar to a previous deal Monarch formed with Euroberlin France. In 1993, Monarch Airlines introduced the Airbus A320 aircraft followed by the larger Airbus A321 in 1997. The Airbus A320 replaced the airline's fleet of Boeing 737-300s.

After 1995, Monarch came under increasing pressure from newly formed budget airlines. It would eventually stop all charter flying ten years later. This announcement was in response to customers abandoning Monarch's offering of package tours in favour of independent tours on seat-only low-cost airlines.

During May 1997, Monarch Airlines launched a new scheduled route between Gibraltar and Luton, with additional flights to Gibraltar by the company established from Birmingham, Gatwick and Manchester. Monarch continued to operate flights on the Gibraltar-Luton route until the firm's collapse. During the late 1990s, a new in-flight service referred to as Monarch Plus, included pre-booked seats, free headsets and improved dining options, such as duck breast instead of turkey stroganoff, for an additional £30 per person.

During 1998, Monarch Airlines leased a pair of McDonnell Douglas MD-11 wide-body aircraft from American airline World Airways for its long-haul operations. This lease was interim for the delivery of a pair of new Airbus A330-200 wide-body aircraft. Following the arrival of the A330 in 1999, Monarch opted to return the leased MD-11s to World Airways. The adoption of the A330 wide-bodies permitted Monarch to serve long-haul charter destinations with a two class seating configuration, which was another first for the airline.

=== 2000s ===
Monarch logo, used between 2002 and 2008

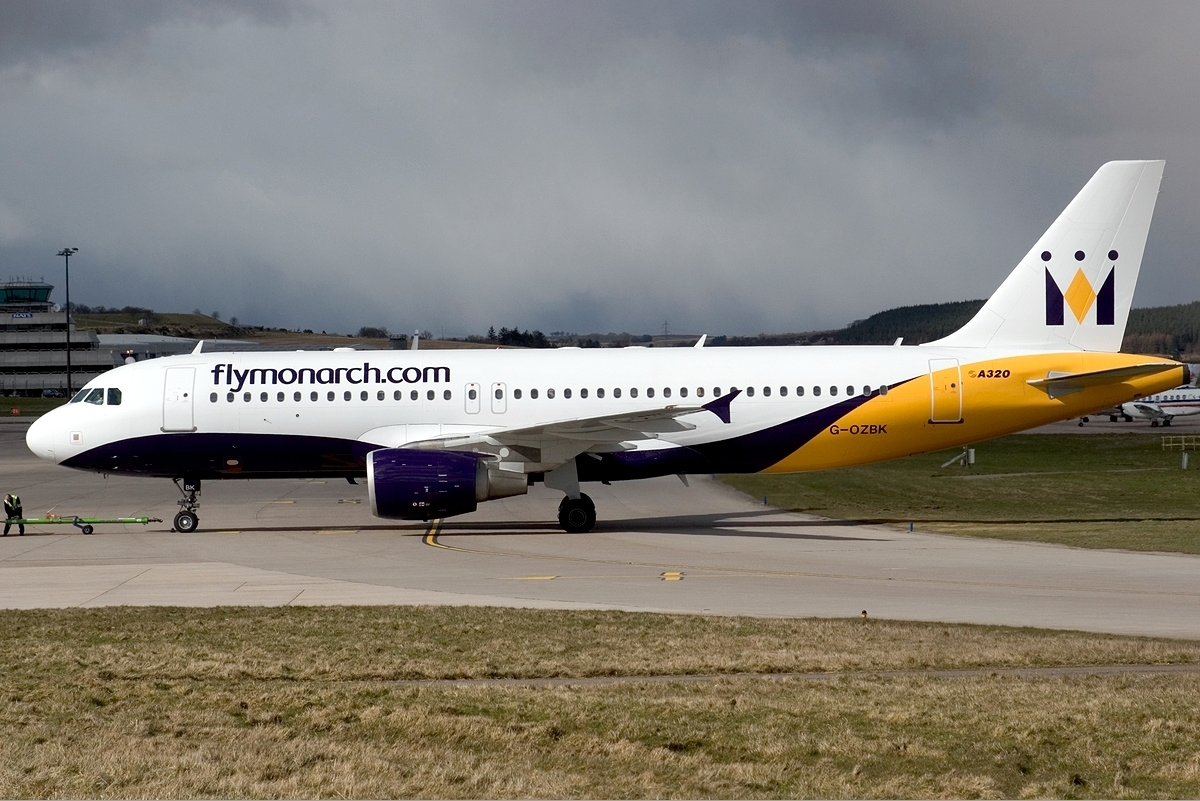
Airbus A320 at Aberdeen Airport with flymonarch.com written at the front, the airline's original web address

During 2002, Monarch retired the sole McDonnell Douglas DC-10 from service and donated it to the Manchester Airport Aviation Viewing Park. That same year, Monarch also unveiled a brand-new livery – the airline's fourth. Also, the company rebranded its Monarch Crown Service scheduled division as Monarch Scheduled. Monarch Scheduled continued to offer a full-service product, including free catering, bar service, hot towels, newspapers and in-flight entertainment (IFE).

During 2003, Monarch Scheduled announced that it would open a new base at Gatwick Airport. On 1 May 2003, this base opened, initially offering services to Alicante, Faro and Málaga. On 15 December 2004, Monarch Scheduled announced that it would open a new base at Birmingham Airport. The station opened in April 2005 with new routes to Málaga and Tenerife.

In 2004, following the success of the low-fares, no-frills airlines such as easyJet, Monarch decided to adopt a modified low-cost model, featuring additional charges for food and drink. In 2005 (until 2010), Monarch leased a Boeing 767-300ER from MyTravel Airways (which then became Thomas Cook Airlines) to expand its long-haul fleet.

During November 2005, Monarch opened a base in Málaga. The airline based one Airbus A320 aircraft there. Monarch launched three scheduled services from Málaga to Aberdeen, Blackpool and Newquay. The Málaga-Newquay route was discontinued on 30 April 2006. About a year later, Monarch retired the Málaga-Blackpool service due to low demand. On 27 October 2007, the airliner withdrew the Málaga-Aberdeen route as well, resulting in the closure of Monarch's Málaga base.

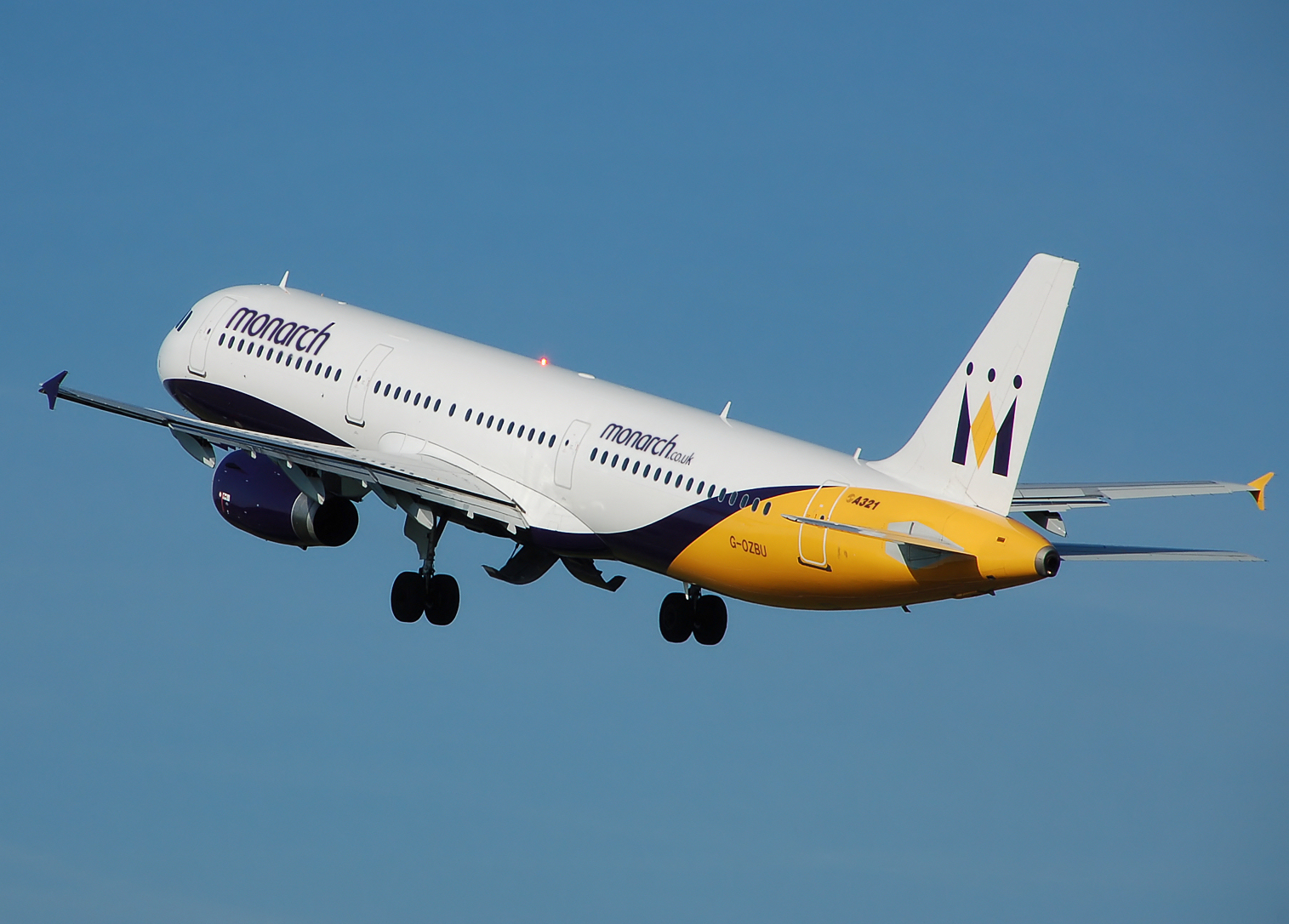
Airbus A321-200 in the 2009 livery

To operate scheduled services from Manchester, an Airbus A321 was acquired. Monarch became the airport's second-largest passenger airline in 2005 with 1.72 million passengers using its services from/to the airport. Monarch's total passenger numbers increased from 4.55 million in 2002 to 6.5 million in 2008.

In August 2006, Monarch ordered six Boeing 787-8 Dreamliner widebodied jets, primarily for use on long-haul routes. Delivery was planned to start in 2010; however, delays to the 787 project pushed back delivery to 2013, and in September 2011, the airline announced the cancellation of the order, citing its strategic decision to concentrate on its short-/medium-haul operations.

On 27 April 2007, Monarch Airlines started flights to Ibiza partnered with club brand HedKandi, naming the partnership "FlyKandi". One of Monarch's Boeing 757s (G-MOND) received a special FlyKandi livery with billboard FlyKandi titles and a special tail motif. The HedKandi partnership lasted for the 2007 summer season, with flights to Ibiza sold from four major UK airports. It was then renewed for the 2008 summer season, offering the same services. This time FlyKandi livery was applied to G-MONJ. HedKandi CDs and radio stations were available for purchase and to listen to onboard Monarch aircraft.

In October 2007, Monarch became the first airline in Europe to accept PayPal as a flight payment option on its website.

During 2008, Monarch changed the name of its website from flymonarch.com to monarch.co.uk. It also changed its advertising slogan to "The Low Fare Airline That Cares".

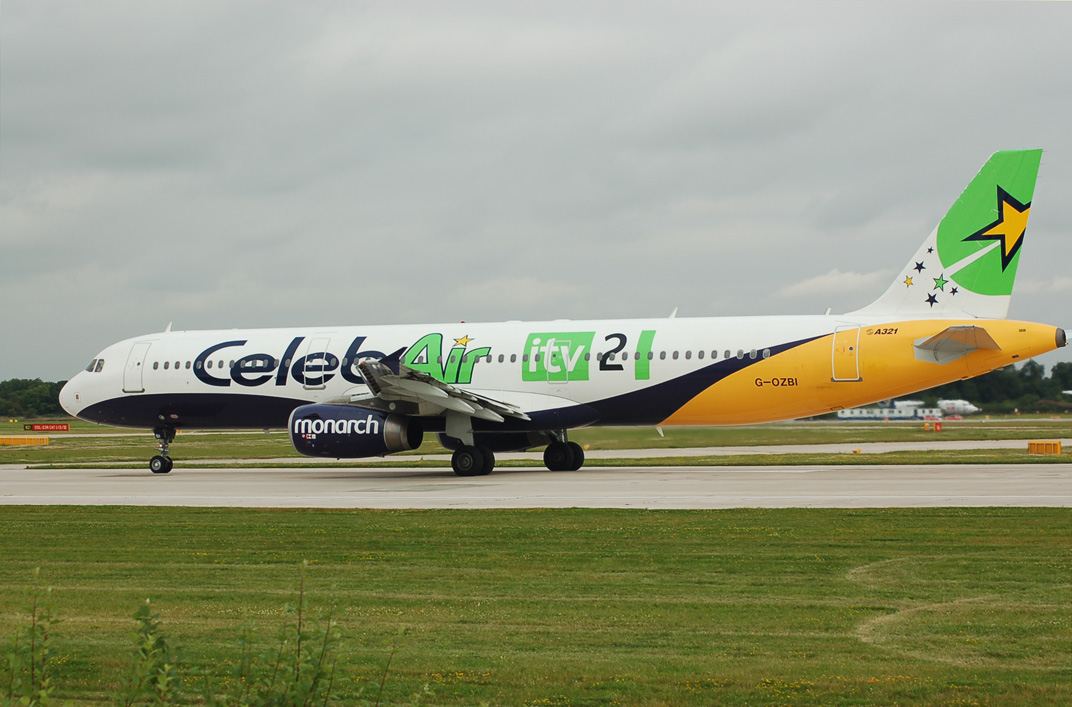
Monarch's CelebAir aircraft

During 2008, Monarch provided the aircraft, an Airbus A321, to launch the ITV2 television programme CelebAir. Celebrities were trained and took on duties performed by airline staff, such as cabin crew. The destinations to which CelebAir flew were mainly Monarch's scheduled destinations, including Málaga, Alicante, Tenerife, Faro, Ibiza, Mahón and Larnaca. These flights carried fare-paying passengers. The programme first aired on 2 September 2008. Lisa Maffia won the series, Amy Lamé finishing second and Chico Slimani finishing third.

=== 2010 to 2014 ===
After many years of operating profitably, Monarch Group, the parent company of Monarch Airlines and Cosmos Holidays, reported a large pre-tax loss of £32.3 million in the financial year ending in 2009. This loss necessitated a £45 million cash injection from the Mantegazzas who had co-owned the group since its inception. Monarch Airlines also changed its focus from being primarily a charter airline to becoming a predominantly "scheduled leisure airline." Monarch targeted 80% of its business to being "scheduled" (compared with only 20% in 2005). Under the new strategy they introduced additional scheduled services to new destinations in Egypt, Turkey, Greece, Spain and Portugal, including the launch on 23 May 2011 of a three-times-weekly scheduled service to the Greek island of Corfu — the airline's first scheduled Greek destination – from London Luton.

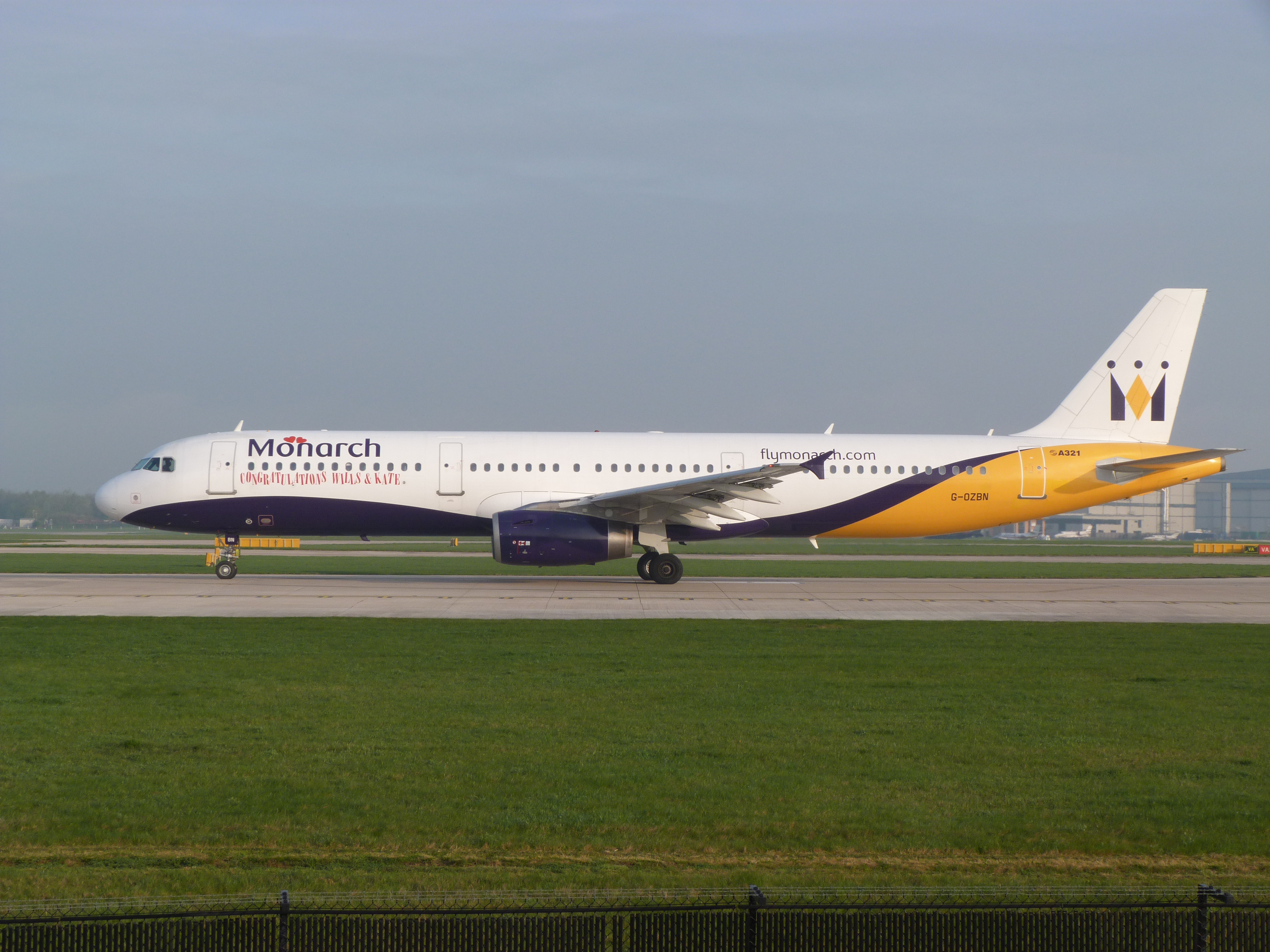
Airbus A321-200 at Manchester Airport in the Prince William & Kate Royal Wedding scheme

Monarch abolished all debit card charges in favour of a single £10 flat rate applied to credit card transactions. This change was a bid to increase the airliner's attractiveness as a viable alternative to EasyJet and Ryanair, its main low-cost competitors. To highlight these differences as additional selling points, Monarch introduced the advertising slogan Fly Your Way Every Day. Monarch also introduced a rebrand incorporating the airline's old capital "M" and crown, as well as the airline's fifth livery.

Although Monarch made a £1.4 million profit in 2010, it reported a £45 million loss in the financial year ending 31 October 2011. This loss was a result of high jet fuel prices against the backdrop of a stagnant economy, as well as political turmoil in the Middle East. Higher fuel prices increased the airline's annual fuel bill by £50 million.

On 3 November 2011, Monarch received a £75 million rescue package for the airline. Monarch also announced a launch of 14 additional routes serving new destinations in Italy, Croatia and Greece from their bases. The new flights commenced at the start of the 2012 summer season. Monarch also received two Airbus A320 aircraft to support the increased level of activity. The addition of these aircraft was the first stage of a medium-term plan to increase the fleet size to 40 aircraft in support of the airline's goal to carry 10 million passengers annually. Growing the fleet to increase passenger numbers was supposed to allow the airline to spread its fixed costs over a higher output level, resulting in greater economies of scale.

On 3 May 2012, Monarch announced that they were to open a new base at East Midlands Airport in Autumn 2012. The new station will replace some routes previously flown by Bmibaby, who ceased operations completely on 9 September 2012. On 8 May 2012, the airline announced operations from Leeds/Bradford with two new winter destinations, Munich and Grenoble. They also announced plans for a large expansion in summer 2013. On 10 July 2012, Monarch announced a launch of a new base at Leeds/Bradford with 12 new destinations. The base opened on 22 March 2013. As of mid-2012, Globus Travel's shareholders included Amerald Investments (88%), Atlantic Financial Services (7%) and Abaco Holdings (4%). On 13 December 2012, Monarch announced that they had come on board as a new sponsor for Leeds United FC. This sponsorship promotes Monarch's base and routes at Leeds Bradford Airport.

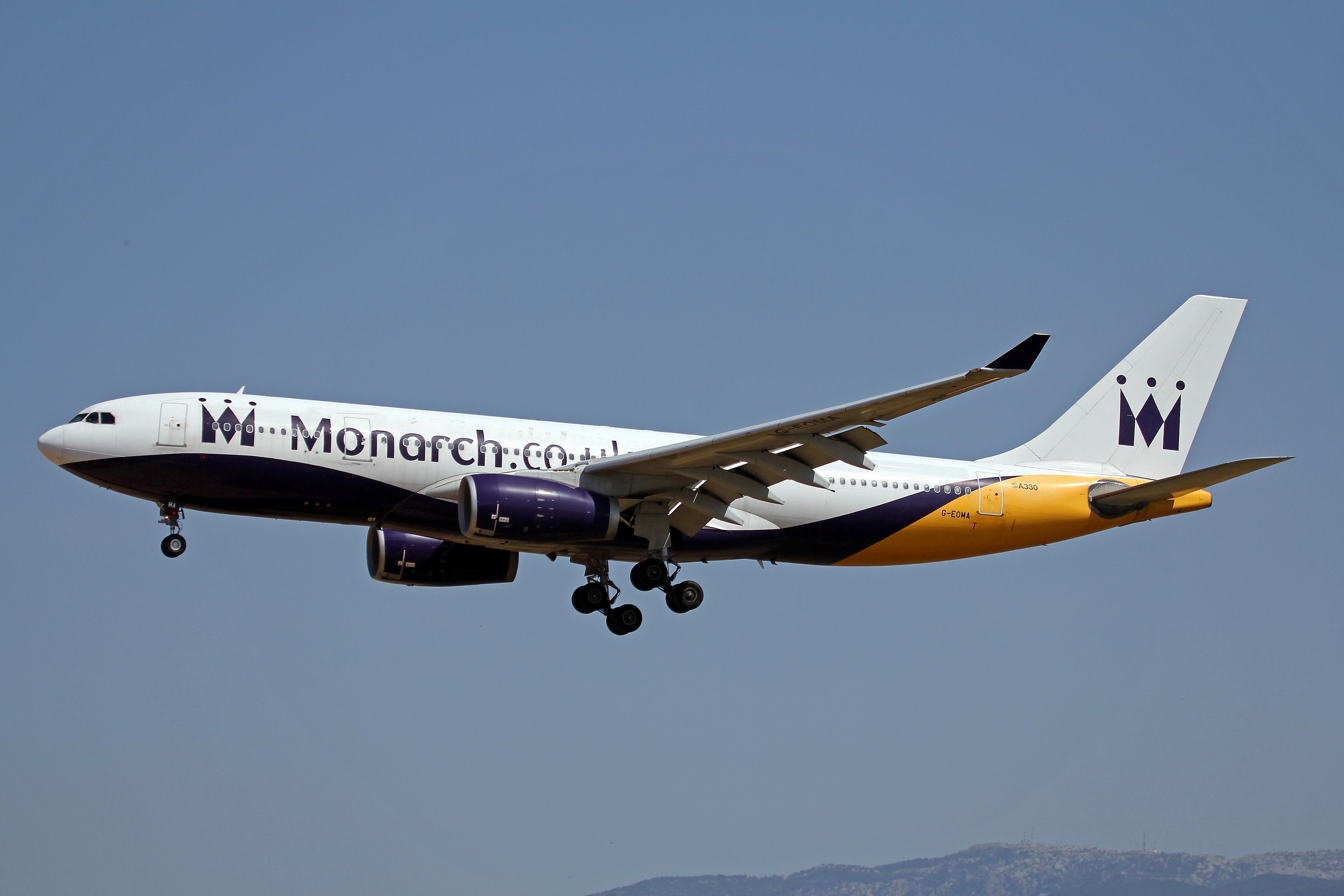
Airbus A330-200s operated until long-haul operations were halted in April 2015.

On 1 July 2013, Monarch announced an order for a further two Airbus A321s. The aircraft was due to be delivered in April and May 2015, but it changed to just a single A320 in April 2015. On 12 December 2013, Monarch announced that Monarch Airlines had returned to profit in the year ending October 2013 and that passenger numbers were up 9.5% to 7 million and in line to carry more than 10 million by 2016. In the same announcement, Monarch confirmed that it planned to order 60 new aircraft in an order worth $6 billion for delivery up to 2024 and would announce the successful tender in Q1 of 2014 from either Airbus/Boeing and Bombardier.

In July 2014 the airline announced that it had selected Boeing, with the 737MAX, as the preferred bidder for 30 new aircraft. Monarch confirmed the order in October 2014, with deliveries due to take place from Q2 of 2018.

=== 2014 to 2017: troubles and end of operations ===
In August 2014, Monarch announced it was undergoing a strategic review of the company which would involve cost reduction initiatives. As part of the plan, Monarch announced the closure of their East Midlands base on 14 August 2014. The company also made many staff redundant with reduction in payroll mainly aimed at onboard cabin management in preparation for the company sale in October 2014.

On 24 October 2014, Monarch Holdings was acquired from the Globus Travel Group by the private investment company and turnaround specialist Greybull Capital. The purchase, for a nominal sum, was made just hours before Monarch's licence with the Civil Aviation Authority expired. Greybull was to own 90% of the airline, with the remaining 10% held by the group's pension fund and provide access to £125 million of new capital. Monarch announced that it would downsize its fleet from 42 to 34 aircraft and renegotiate leases on ten aircraft. Monarch it was also going to cease long-haul and charter operations from April 2015, converting to a low-cost model focusing on short-haul leisure routes. However, the new finance was said to secure the order for 30 Boeing 737 MAX 8 aircraft signed up to at the 2014 Farnborough Air Show.

Following the downsize in operations, Monarch Airlines carried 5.7 million passengers during 2015, a 19% reduction compared with 2014. However, demand for flights on Monarch's major holiday routes to Egypt and Turkey continued to fall because of passenger fears raised by the Syrian civil war, the Egyptian political crisis and the 2016 Turkish coup d'état attempt.

On 25 September 2016, rumours surfaced online about Monarch Airlines' imminent bankruptcy, which the airline strongly denied. The Civil Aviation Authority had commenced chartering spare planes from other airlines for potential repatriation of British citizens at short notice. However, in the following days, Monarch obtained additional funds from shareholders, and on 30 September 2016, its Civil Aviation Authority ATOL licence was temporarily extended until 12 October. On 12 October 2016, Monarch Airlines successfully retained its ATOL licence after it received an additional £165 million in investment funding. At the time, the cash injection was believed to have come from Greybull Capital but one year later, it was revealed that Boeing had provided the majority of the sum to save the struggling airline.

In September 2017, reports emerged of Monarch facing difficulties over its licence, as had happened in the previous year. On Saturday 30 September 2017, the Civil CAA extended Monarch's licence for 24 hours due to financial issues. Once again the Civil Aviation Authority began chartering spare planes from other airlines (including ten planes from Qatar Airways). Although Monarch had received an extension to its licence, it tripled fares; the price increases showing a deliberate attempt to effectively price itself out of the market and reduce exposure to any claims.

Late evening on 1 October 2017, the airline cancelled late-night flights to Ibiza at the boarding stage as the deadline for its licence loomed. On the morning of 2 October at 03:19 BST, the airline's final flight, ZB3785 from Tel Aviv to Manchester, landed. Shortly afterwards - at approximately 04:00 BST - the CAA confirmed that Monarch Airlines (along with its subsidiaries) had ceased operations with immediate effect and had entered administration. This left 110,000 passengers stranded overseas, and 300,000 future bookings cancelled.

Thirty-eight aircraft of various sizes from 15 European, Middle Eastern, and Canadian operators (Note: Including Qatar Airways (ten aircraft), Titan Airways (five aircraft), Air Transat (four aircraft), Freebird Airlines and Wamos Air (three aircraft each), and smaller numbers from other airlines and charter operators) were chartered to repatriate British citizens from abroad. In total, the operation cost £60 million, paid from the Air Travel Trust Fund which in turn is funded by an airline and passenger levy. The operation was the UK's biggest ever post-war repatriation at the time.

Monarch was the largest airline ever to have ceased trading in the UK until the collapse of Thomas Cook in 2019. The causal factors of Monarch's demise were various. First, vicious competition and excess capacity on routes to southern Europe from other low-cost rivals must have played a part in this scenario. Second, travel fears resulting from terrorism in North Africa and also around Europe such as the military coup in Turkey and the 2016 Nice truck attack became the suspect reason. Third, Brexit fears caused the depreciation of the pound sterling, which increased operating costs such as fuel costs, aircraft leasing costs, and airport landing fees.

In April 2021, Monarch Airlines was dissolved after moving out of administration.

== Cabin and services ==
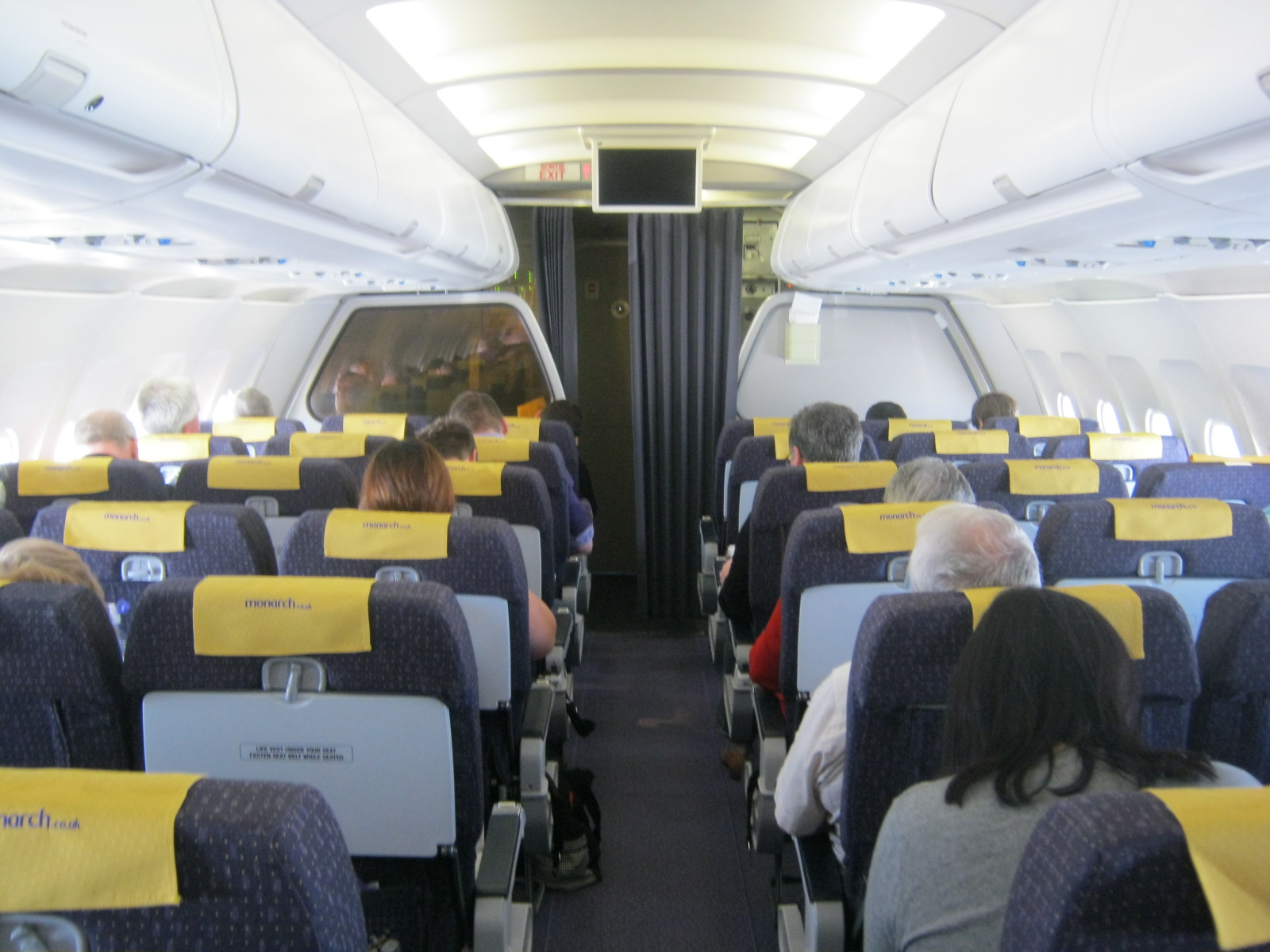
Passenger cabin; the airline was in the process of replacing the reclining seats with new non-reclining, lightweight seats at the time of closure.

As Monarch positioned itself as a low-cost carrier, the airline offered several services for an optional extra fee. This included options such as hold luggage, increased luggage allowance, allocated seating, priority services and in-flight catering. Monarch's aircraft operated in an all-economy layout; extra space seats were located towards the front of the cabin and adjacent to exit doors.

Monarch provided an in-flight magazine named Passport. Its contents included travel guides, a map of Monarch's destinations, interviews and company news. Onboard tax-free/duty-free goods was available to purchase from the Love to Shop inflight magazine. Monarch offered hot and cold food, hot and cold drinks, and alcoholic beverages to purchase on board all flights. The menu

Monarch operated a loyalty scheme named Vantage Club. It rewarded regular customers travelling with the airline with additional travel privileges and benefits. There were three membership tier levels - Indigo, Silver and Gold.

== Corporate affairs ==
At the time of closure Monarch's head office, along with that of Monarch Group, was in Prospect House, on the grounds of London Luton Airport.

=== Ownership and structure ===
Monarch Airlines was part of the Monarch Group, of which the holding company was Monarch Holdings Ltd., which is 90% owned by Greybull Capital. The group's pension fund holds the remaining 10%.

Other subsidiaries of the Monarch Group include Monarch Holidays (previously branded as Cosmos Holidays, but reverted to Globus in 2017), Monarch Hotels, Avro Flights, and Monarch Aircraft Engineering Limited (MAEL). Following the collapse of the other companies, MAEL survived for another 15 months as a stand-alone company focused on third-party maintenance checks. Burdened by the debt load of the collapsed airline, MAEL met the same fate as the rest of the Monarch business on 4 January 2019, with portions sold off piecemeal to competitors

=== Business trends ===
Operational activities over recent years, broken down between scheduled and charter flights, were:

Operational activities
Year	Scheduled				Charter				All services			
Year	Total passengers	Total flights	Load factor	Passenger change YoY	Total passengers	Total flights	Load factor	Passenger change YoY	Total passengers	Total flights	Load factor	Passenger change YoY
2005	2,558,218	16,473	74.1%		2,794,378	12,773	87.7%		5,352,596	29,246	82.5%	
2006	3,134,230	19,834	76.2%	▲22.5%	2,654,004	12,422	86.3%	▼5.0%	5,788,234	32,256	82.0%	▲8.1%
2007	3,625,732	22,443	78.9%	▲15.7%	2,521,233	11,849	85.9%	▼5.0%	6,146,965	34,292	82.6%	▲6.2%
2008	3,870,298	23,158	81.0%	▲6.7%	2,630,528	12,449	86.1%	▲4.3%	6,500,826	35,607	83.6%	▲5.8%
2009	3,668,528	21,581	81.3%	▼5.2%	2,453,557	12,598	85.8%	▼6.7%	6,122,085	34,179	83.6%	▼5.8%
2010	3,691,355	20,640	84.6%	▲0.6%	2,103,347	10,576	85.9%	▼14.3%	5,794,702	31,216	85.2%	▼5.3%
2011	4,541,172	24,468	85.6%	▲23.0%	1,391,291	7,660	80.9%	▼33.9%	5,932,463	32,128	84.1%	▲2.4%
2012	5,355,252	29,112	87.7%	▲17.9%	943,935	6,416	79.0%	▼32.2%	6,299,187	35,528	85.6%	▲6.2%
2013	6,032,879	33,916	86.0%	▲12.7%	788,789	4,505	80.6%	▼16.4%	6,821,668	38,421	85.1%	▲8.3%
2014	6,269,624	37,806	81.8%	▲3.9%	757,956	4,537	77.1%	▼3.9%	7,027,580	42,343	81.1%	▲3.0%
2015	5,496,455	33,409	82.7%	▼12.3%	226,780	1,387	70.7%	▼70.0%	5,723,235	34,796	82.3%	▼18.6%
2016	—N/a								5,434,081	35,619	75.9%	▼5.0%
2017	—N/a								3,403,637	21,133	80.5%	▼37.4%

== Awards ==
- FlightOnTime.info Most Improved UK Charter Airline for Punctuality – Summer 2007
- Travel Trade Gazette Airline of the Year – Leisure 2006 and 2007
- TravelWeekly Globe Travel Awards – Best Charter Airline 2009, 2010 and 2011
- World's greenest airline ITB Berlin travel show – The number 1 greenest airline 2011
- TravelMole Best Airline Website 2012

== Fleet ==
At the time of closure, the Monarch Airlines fleet consisted of the following aircraft:

Fleet at closure
Aircraft	In service	Orders	Passengers	Remarks
Airbus A320-200	9	—	174	Planned to be replaced by Boeing 737 MAX.
Airbus A321-200	25	—	214	Planned to be replaced by Boeing 737 MAX. Four Airbus A321-200 aircraft were purchased by and delivered to Thomas Cook Airlines in 2018 and the rest was sold to other airlines by 2018. Launch customer
Boeing 737-800	1	—	186	Leased from Pegasus Airlines.
Boeing 737 MAX 8	—	45	—	Was planned to be delivered from Q2 2018.
Total	35	45		

Monarch had also operated the following aircraft types:

Historical fleet
Aircraft	Total	Introduced	Retired	
Airbus A300-600R	4	1991	2014	
Airbus A330-200	2	1999	2015	These two aircraft were later used by the CAA, leased from Wamos for the repatriation flights in October 2017.
BAC One-Eleven 500	3	1974	1986	
Boeing 707-120B	4	1978	1981	
Boeing 707-320C	1	1981	1981	
Boeing 720B	7	1971	1983	
Boeing 737-200	6	1981	1987	
Boeing 737-300	12	1988	1997	Replaced by Airbus A320-200s and Airbus A321-200s
Boeing 757-200	11	1983	2015	
Boeing 767-300ER	1	2005	2010	G-DIMB leased from MyTravel Airways for five years.
Bristol Britannia 300	8	1967	1974	One preserved by Duxford Aviation Society at Imperial War Museum Duxford
McDonnell Douglas DC-10-30	1	1996	2002	Nose and forward fuselage section preserved at Manchester Airport Viewing Park
McDonnell Douglas MD-11	1	1998	1998	Leased from World Airways - Registered N273WA from 14 May to 14 August 1998 & N277WA from 14 August to 3 November 1998

== Accidents and incidents ==
- On 14 January 1985, a Boeing 757, registration G-MOND, flying Monarch Flight 390 from Tenerife to Luton suffered two mid-flight explosions. Soon after, the aircraft lost electrical power, and smoke began filling the cabin, leading to an emergency landing in Portugal. The cause was leaking lavatory fluid which had come into contact with electrical wiring, resulting in severe electrical arcing. This event created smoke and power surges and caused the aircraft's electronic flight interfaces to fail and blank out. It was the first known British-operated aircraft to suffer a severe Kapton-related problem.
- On 22 May 2002, a Boeing 757-200, registration G-MONC, operating a flight from Luton suffered structural damage to the forward fuselage in the area of the nose landing gear during landing at Gibraltar Airport. The captain had used an incorrect landing technique, applying full nose-down elevator after the main gear had touched down with the effect of pitching the nosewheel down hard onto the runway, exceeding the design limits. There were no injuries.
- On 17 March 2006 at 19:45, the flight deck crew of a Boeing 757-200, registration G-MONE, while attempting to land at Gibraltar Airport lost visual contact with the runway (strobe lights) after passing the Visual Decision Point (VDP). During the subsequent go-around, the crew did not follow the correct missed approach heading. However, air traffic control (ATC) directed them to avoid striking the high ground. In actuality the lowest altitude of the aircraft when overland was 2,100 ft (640 m) while the highest point overland, the Rock of Gibraltar just south of the airfield, is 1,420 ft (430 m) asl. Following the incident, ATC and Monarch Airlines changed their procedures to reduce the chances of repeating a similar occurrence.

== See also ==
- List of defunct airlines of the United Kingdom
