= Avalon Waterways =

River cruise company owned by the Globus family of brands

- Type: Private
- Industry: Travel, Tourism, River cruise company, Cruise line
- Founded: 2004
- Headquarters: Lugano, Switzerland and Littleton, Colorado
- Products: River cruises
- Parent: Globus family of brands

Avalon Waterways is a river cruise company owned by the Globus family of brands and offers cruises in Europe, China, Southeast Asia, South America, India and the Galápagos Islands. The company became a member of Cruise Lines International Association (CLIA) in August 2009.

== History and ship design ==
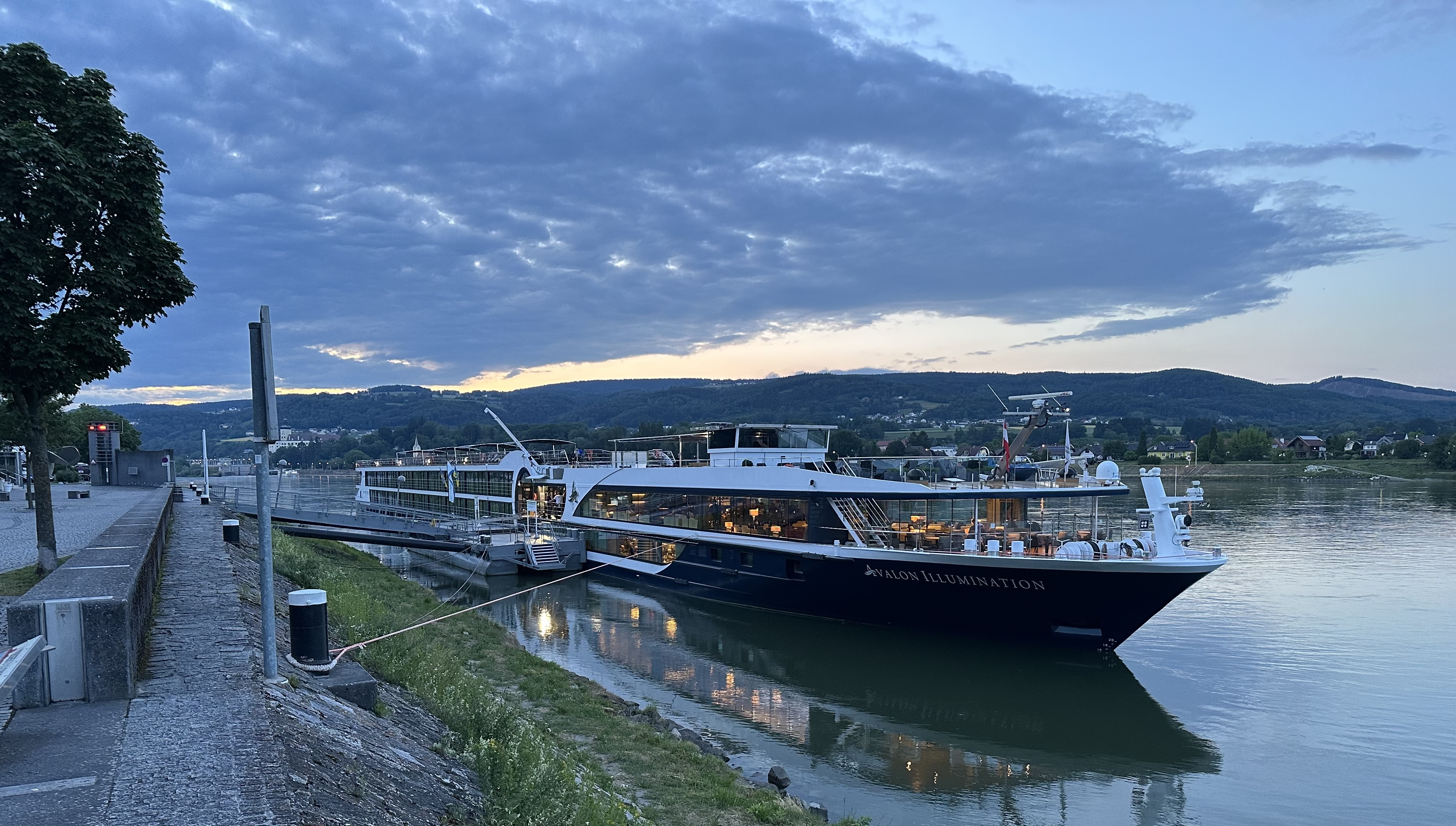
Avalon Illumination on the Danube in Austria, 2026

Avalon Waterways started operations in 2004 with just one initial ship, called Avalon Artistry. The following year, the company added the Avalon Poetry to its fleet.

As of 2019, the company operates ships on the Danube, Rhine, Moselle, Rhone, Seine and Saône in Europe; The Mekong River in Southeast Asia, as well as on the Yangtze (in China), the Ganges (in India) and the Amazon River (in Peru).

Avalon Waterways has earned river cruise operator awards including "Best European river line" in 2019.

== Fleet ==
Since its launch in 2004, Avalon Waterways has christened 23 new ships in Europe and three new ships in Southeast Asia.

Ship	Entered service	Length	Staterooms	Passengers	Notes
Avalon View	2022	443 ft (135 m)	83	166	Owned. Europe. "Suite Ship" with 67, 200-square-foot (19 m^{2}) suites.
Avalon Envision	2019	443 ft (135 m)	83	166	Owned. Europe. "Suite Ship" with 67, 200-square-foot (19 m^{2}) suites.
Avalon Imagery II	2016	361 ft (110 m)	64	128	Owned. Europe. "Suite Ship" with 52, 200-square-foot (19 m^{2}) suites.
Avalon Passion	2016	443 ft (135 m)	83	166	Owned. Europe. "Suite Ship" with 67, 200-square-foot (19 m^{2}) suites.
Avalon Tranquility II	2015 (March)	361 ft (110 m).	64	128	Owned. Europe. "Suite Ship" with 52, 200-square-foot (19 m^{2}) suites.
Avalon Tapestry II	2015 (March)	443 ft (135 m).	83	166	Owned. Europe. "Suite Ship" with 67, 200-square-foot (19 m^{2}) suites.
Avalon Poetry II	2014	443 ft (135 m).	83	166	Owned. Europe. "Suite Ship" with 67, 200-square-foot (19 m^{2}) suites.
Avalon Illumination	2014	443 ft (135 m).	83	166	Owned. Europe. "Suite Ship" with 67, 200-square-foot (19 m^{2}) suites.
Avalon Impression	2014	443 ft (135 m).	83	166	Owned. Europe. "Suite Ship" with 67, 200-square-foot (19 m^{2}) suites.
Avalon Expression	2013	443 ft (135 m).	83	166	Owned. Europe. "Suite Ship" with 67, 200-square-foot (19 m^{2}) suites.
Avalon Artistry II	2013	361 ft (110 m).	64	128	Owned. Europe. "Suite Ship" with 52, 200-square-foot (19 m^{2}) suites.
Avalon Visionary	2012	361 ft (110 m).	64	128	Owned. Europe. "Suite Ship" with 52, 200-square-foot (19 m^{2}) suites.
Avalon Vista	2012	443 ft (135 m).	83	166	Owned. Europe. "Suite Ship" with 66, 200-square-foot (19 m^{2}) suites.
Avalon Panorama	2011	443 ft (135 m).	83	166	Owned. Europe. First "Suite Ship" with 66, 200-square-foot (19 m^{2}) suites.
Avalon Luminary	2010	361 ft (110 m).	69	138	Retired from fleet in 2019.
Avalon Felicity	2010	361 ft (110 m).	69	138	Retired from fleet in 2019.
Avalon Affinity	2009	361 ft (110 m).	69	138	Retired from fleet in 2019.
Avalon Creativity	2009	361 ft.	70	140	Retired from fleet in 2019.
Avalon Scenery	2008	361 ft (110 m).	69	138	Retired from fleet in 2018.
Avalon Imagery	2007	443 ft (135 m).	85	170	Retired from fleet in 2012.
Avalon Tranquility	2007	443 ft (135 m).	85	170	Retired from fleet in 2012.
Avalon Tapestry	2006	443 ft (135 m).	82	164	Retired from fleet in 2011.
Avalon Poetry	2005	426 ft (130 m).	88	174	Retired from fleet in 2010.
Avalon Artistry	2004	426 ft (130 m).	89	176	Retired from fleet in 2010.
Avalon Angkor	2012	131 ft (40 m).	16	32	Retired from fleet in 2015.
Avalon Saigon	2017 (September)	200 ft (61 m).	18	36	Owned. SE Asia. All rooms are 245-square-foot suites.
Avalon Siem Reap	2015 (January)	200 ft (61 m).	18	36	Retired from fleet in 2020.
Avalon Myanmar	2015 (September)	200 ft (61 m).	18	36	Owned. SE Asia. All rooms are 245-square-foot suites.
Century Legend	2013	465 ft (142 m).	196	392	Chartered from Century Cruises. China.
Century Paragon	2013	465 ft (142 m).	196	392	Chartered from Century Cruises. China.
Isabella II	2000	166 ft (51 m).	21	42	Chartered. Galápagos Islands.
Aria	2011	147 ft (45 m).	16	32	Chartered. South America (Amazon).
Ganges Voyager	2015	185 ft (56 m).	28	56	Chartered. India (Ganges).

== Special interest cruises ==
Avalon has offered a range of special interest cruises including culinary-, beer- and Christmas-themed itineraries.

== Godmothers ==
Godmothers of its ships in Europe have included TV personality Meredith Vieira, Eat, Pray, Love author Elizabeth Gilbert, Outlander author Diana Gabaldon, singer/songwriter Jann Arden, 1,000 Places to See Before You Die author Patricia Schultz and U.S. Women's National Team coach Jill Ellis.
