= Sergio Mantegazza =

Swiss businessman (1927–2024)

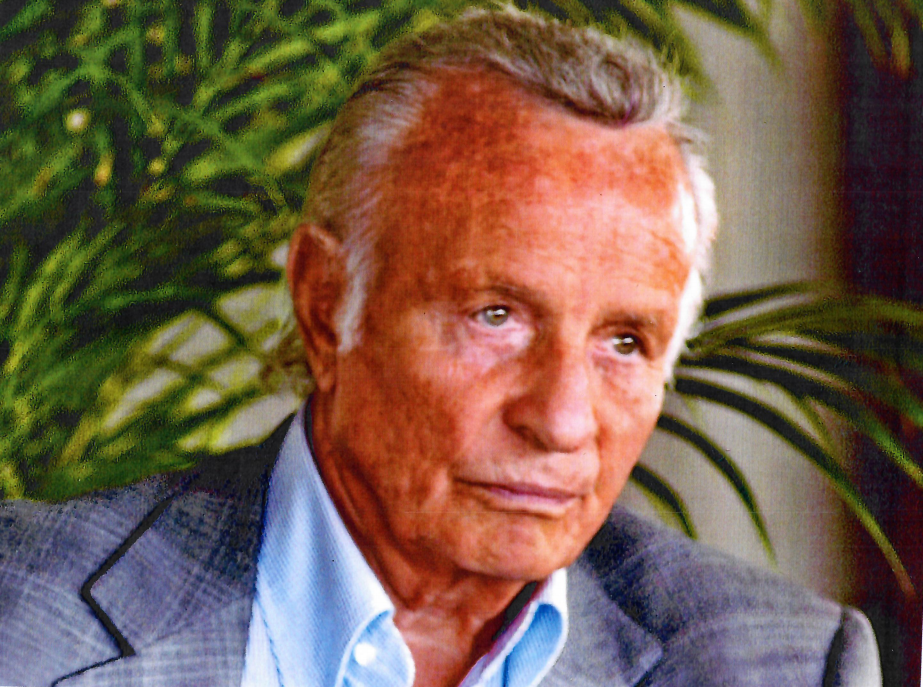
- Born: 31 October 1927; Lugano, Switzerland
- Died: 13 February 2024 (aged 96); Lugano, Switzerland
- Education: Gademann Business School and Istituto Elvetico
- Occupations: Chairman and owner, Globus
- Children: 3

Sergio Mantegazza (31 October 1927 – 13 February 2024) was a Swiss-Italian billionaire businessman, chairman and owner of Globus, a multinational travel company. According to Forbes, Mantegazza was the 16th richest person in Switzerland, with an estimated net worth of US$2.7 billion as of February 2024.

== Early life ==
Sergio Mantegazza was born in Lugano, Switzerland, to Antonio and Angelina Mantegazza in 1927. He had a brother, Geo Mantegazza. He was educated at Istituto Elvetico and Gademann Business School.

== Career ==
As a young man, Mantegazza developed further business and entrepreneurial skills by working in the family business after leaving education. Founded by his father Antonio in 1928, Globus Viaggi initially started with a single gondola ferrying tourists and goods across and around Lake Lugano, Switzerland. Antonio Mantegazza went on to acquire a fleet of 12 coaches to transport tourists around the area. By 1950, the company operated 33 coaches with the addition of overnight excursions to Rome, Venice and the French Riviera.

Globus operated circular tours to provide a more complete travel experience for its customers as well as providing the option of budget motor-coach European holidays. They later introduced the concept of Grand European Touring by offering first-class European tours to tourists.

In 1961, the Globus group launched Cosmos Holidays in the United Kingdom and air holiday packages to southern Europe. This also led to other destinations like Canada, Australia and New Zealand.

In the late 1960s, Monarch Airlines was financed by the Globus Partners. This airline, established by two British businessmen, Bill Hodgson and Don Peacock, operated independently of Globus Getaway Holidays. Monarch Airlines, working with Cosmos, were pioneers of packaged holidays and chartered flights in the UK.

Mantegazza took over as president of Globus in 1975 and expanded the travel and tour business, introducing travel packages to Africa, Australia and South America. Globus also launched its North American company Group Voyagers, overseeing US tour operations and the American market for the Globus and Cosmos brands. In 2003, Avalon Waterways and Monograms were also created, focusing on independent travel and river cruises.

In October 2014, despite a personal injection of $180 million into the business, it emerged that the Mantegazza family had allowed a £220 million pension shortfall to develop, and it was reported that the Mantegazza family sold Monarch Airlines to Greybull Capital for £1. This deal involved the company's pension scheme transferring into the statutory Pension Protection Fund (PPF), causing 70 Monarch pilot's pension benefits to be affected by the PPF compensation cap. The Pension Regulator's subsequent statutory report later concluded that the majority of scheme members received 90% or more of their benefits. However, the deal was nonetheless criticised by The Guardian, which stated that the pilots' retirement plans had been "wrecked", and as stated by Frank Field MP, Chairman of the Work and Pensions Select Committee, in a letter to the Pension Protection Fund - "Compared to the hundreds of millions pounds of debt they were being released from, the [pension] deal was a good one for the Mantegazzas only."

Furthermore, in 2021, the court of appeal ruled the PPF pension cap unlawful. The fallout of this ruling means that the actions of Mantegazza and later Greybull, have cost the taxpayer additional millions.

== Personal life ==
Mantegazza was married with three children (two living) and lived in Lugano, Switzerland.

His son, Paolo, worked for Bankers Trust and Credit Suisse, before becoming president and CEO of Globus' US business Group Voyagers in 1998, and killed himself in 2004, at the age of 34. His son, Fabio Mantegazza (born 1955), was working with Sergio in the United Kingdom, and was CEO and chairman of Monarch Travel Group Ltd until the beginning of its demise in 2014. His daughter, Maria Dolores Mantegazza (born 1956), serves as a trustee to the Sergio Mantegazza Charitable Foundation in Canton Ticino alongside Fabio Mantegazza and Geo Mantegazza. The Foundation focuses on supporting various charities within the arts and youth sports programs as well as education and medical-related areas. Mantegazza also remained active in the organisation.

Mantegazza had a 64m super-yacht named Lady Marina, where guests have included Tina Turner. He owned substantial residential and commercial real estate in Lugano, Switzerland.

Sergio Mantegazza died on 13 February 2024, at the age of 96.

== Awards ==
Mantegazza joined the British Travel Industry Hall of Fame in 2006 alongside Sir Richard Branson, Sir Rocco Forte and Stephen Kaufer.

Cosmos (formerly Cosmos Holidays) was shortlisted for the Travel Industry and Consumer Awards as well as the Globe Travel Awards, the TTG Travel Awards, the British Travel Awards and also the World of Cruising's Wave Awards, and Cruise International's Cruise Awards.
