= TTG =

TTG may refer to:

== Medicine, science and technology ==
- Tissue transglutaminase (tTG), an enzyme
- Tonalite-trondhjemite-granodiorite, an association of three closely related rock types, found particularly in crust of Archean age
- Transmit/receive transition gap in communications
- TTG, a codon for the amino acid Leucine

== Video, arts and culture ==
- TTG Studios, Los Angeles, US

== Other ==
- Travel Trade Gazette
- Tilhas Tizig Gesheften, also known as the TTG or the TTG Brigade
- Teen Titans Go!
