= Wat Phnom =

Prominent Buddhist temple in Phnom Penh, Cambodia

- វត្តភ្នំ
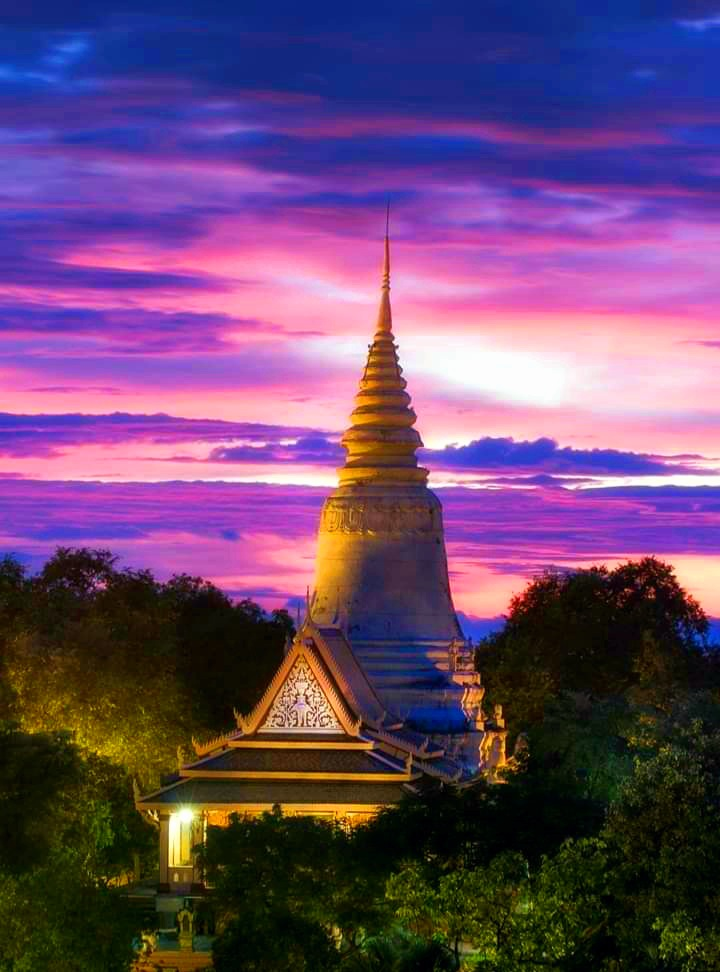
- View of Wat Phnom

Religion
- Affiliation: Theravada Buddhism
- Status: Wat Phnom Historical Park

Location
- Location: Daun Penh, Phnom Penh
- Country: Cambodia
- Interactive map of Wat Phnom
- Coordinates: 11°34′34″N 104°55′23″E

Architecture
- Founder: Penh
- Completed: 1372

Wat Phnom (Khmer: វត្តភ្នំ, UNGEGN: Voăt Phnǒm, ALA-LC: Vatt Bhnaṃ [ʋoət pʰnɔm]; lit. 'hill temple') is a Buddhist temple (wat) in Doun Penh, Phnom Penh. The site features a pagoda, a stupa symbolizing the name of Phnom Penh, and a historical site that is part of the Khmer national identity. Wat Phnom has a total height of 46 meters (150 ft). The pagoda is named after Lady Penh from the story of the discovery of the five statues: four Buddha statues and one Vishnu statue.

== History ==
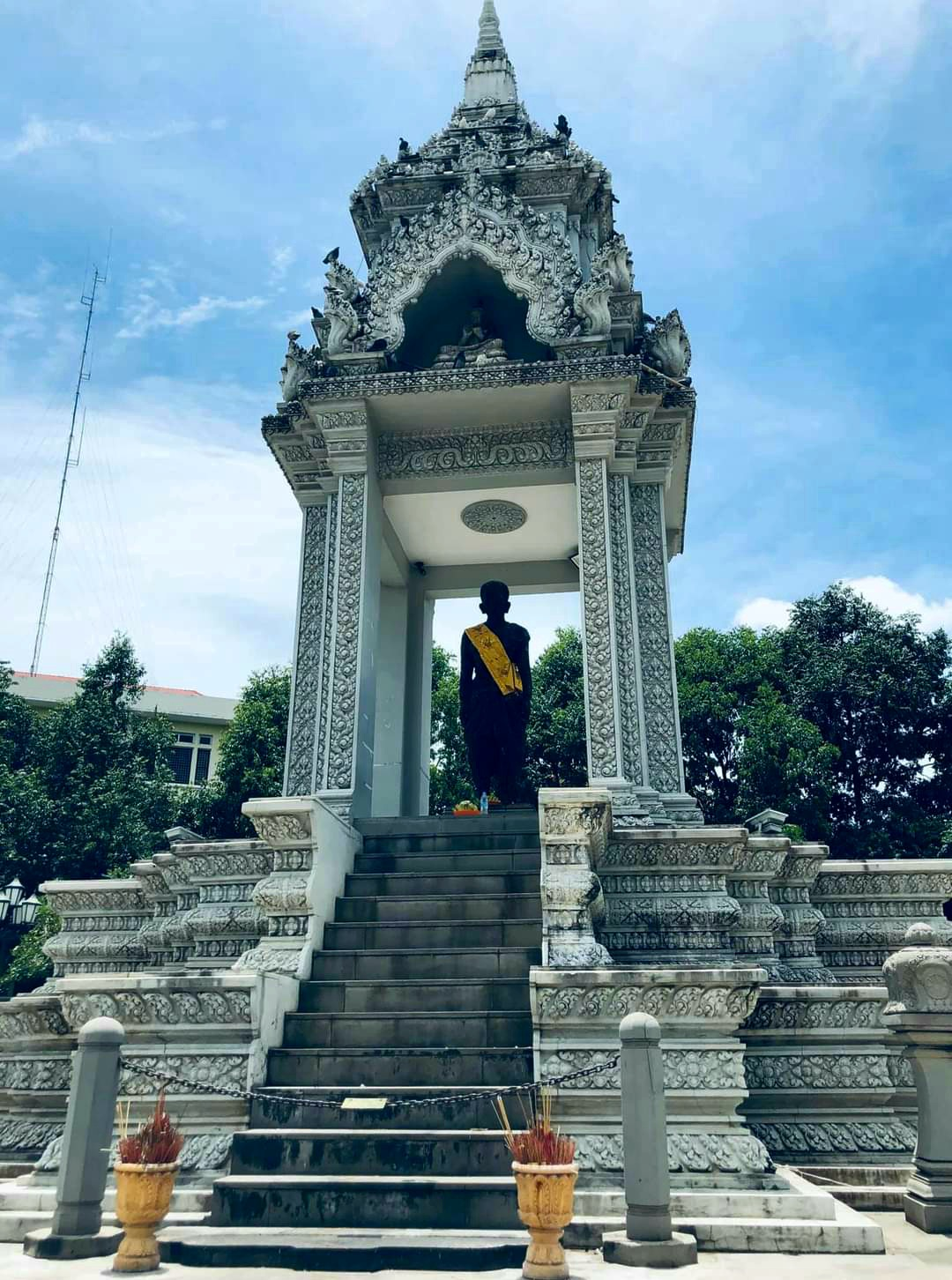
Statue of Daun Penh, the builder of Wat Phnom, the heart of the capital Phnom Penh

According to legend, in 1372, a wealthy old lady named "Penh" lived on a small hill near the bank of the confluence of the four rivers. One day, when it was raining, Penh went down to the port to take a bath and saw a floating Koki tree in the river and she called the village to fish it from the water. She and the villagers took a piece of wood to scrape off the mud and in the hole of the Koki tree, there were four Buddha statues made of bronze, brass and one made of marble. Another statue was in the form of Vishnu with the hands holding a staff, a chain, a snail, and a lotus flower. Penh asked the villagers to help retrieve the Koki tree and retrieve the four treasures. Later, Penh assigned the villagers to build an artificial hill and build a small wooden temple on top of the hill to house the statues. She invited monks to bless the statues and the monks named the hermitage "Wat Phnom" which is known as to this day.

=== 15th century ===
King Ponhea Yat (also known as Barom Reachea I) was King of Cambodia and reigned at Tuol Basan (Srey Santhor) for nine years. At the time there was severe flooding in that area, during which the capital was flooded deep in 1396 AD. When the water receded that year, He ordered Chao Ponhea Decho, the governor of Samrong Tong Province to build a new palace in Russey Keo village in the area of (Wat Phnom) today. Chao Ponhea Decho ordered the people to dig from an area which is now located where the Central Market currently stands. The hole created a lake called Boeung Decho. After a year of flooding, King Ponhea Yat moved his court from Tuol Basan, Kampong Cham province to the confluence of the Tonle Sap River in 1397 AD. After the completion of the palace, King Ponhea Yat ordered the construction of a hermitage hut on the top of the mountain near the temple of Wat Phnom, the hermitage of the district chief, which Cambodians today call Neak Ta Preah Chao and Wat Phnom called "Wat Phnom Doun Penh" "Which marks the name of Grandma "Doun Penh ". After completing the construction of his palace and city, he named the city "Chaktomuk Sakal Kampuchea Thibdey Udiya Mohanakor" in 1416 AD. His reign at Chaktomuk begun the "Chaktomuk Period" of the Kingdom of Kampuchea in 1431. After his death, a large stupa was built for him at the top of Wat Phnom.

== Architecture ==
The sanctuary itself was rebuilt several times in the 19th century and again in 1926. The interior has a central altar complex with a large bronze seated Buddha surrounded by other statues, flowers, candles and items of devotion and worship. The walls are covered with murals, especially of Jataka stories of the Buddha's earlier reincarnations before his attainment of Enlightenment. There are also murals depicting stories from the Reamker, the Khmer version of the Ramayana. The newer murals in the bottom tiers are somewhat balanced, traditional and modern.

The southwest corner of the temple and stupa, is a small shrine dedicated to Lady Penh. The front is often crowded with the faithful bringing their prayers and food offerings to the woman deemed responsible for the founding of the wat.

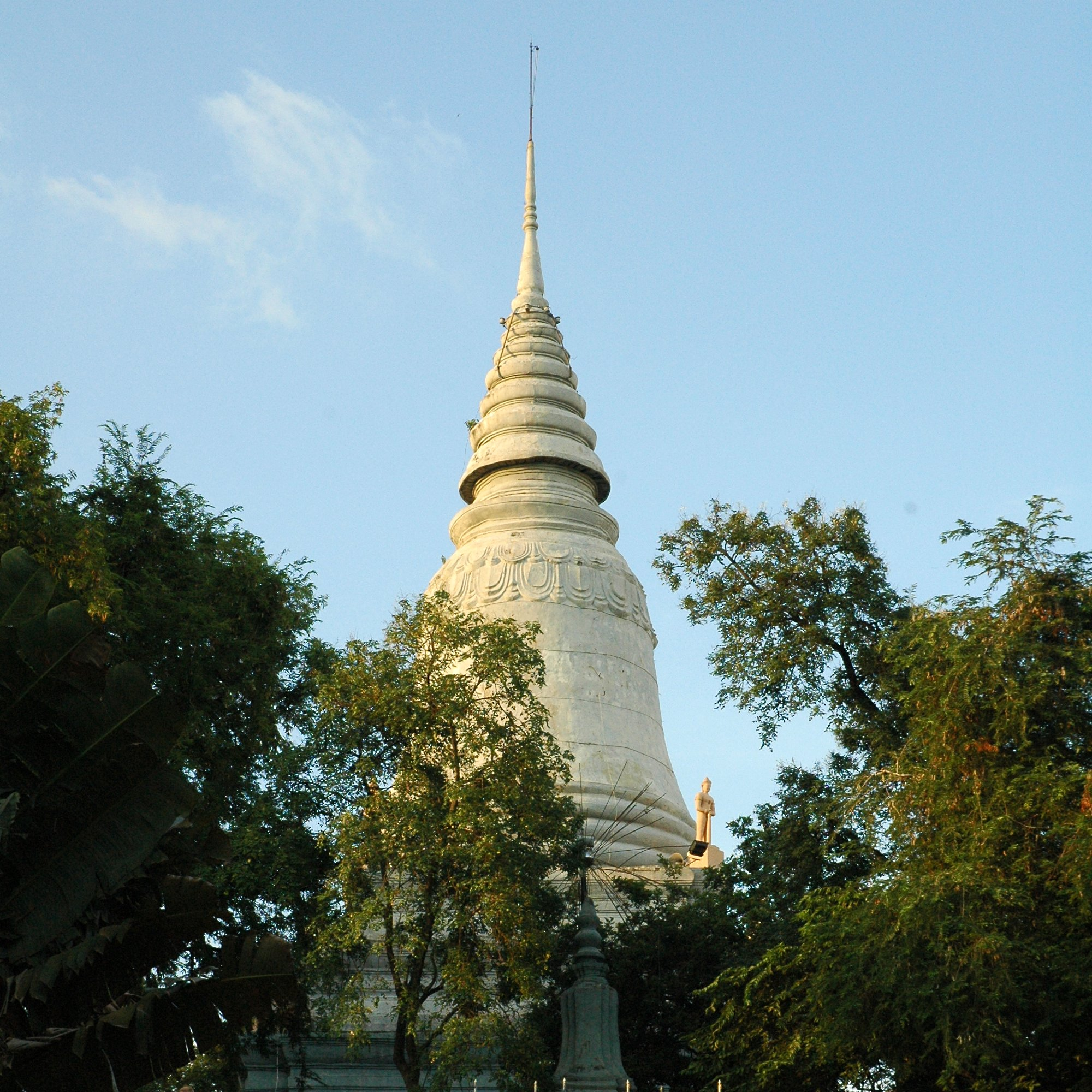
Ponhea Yat Stupa

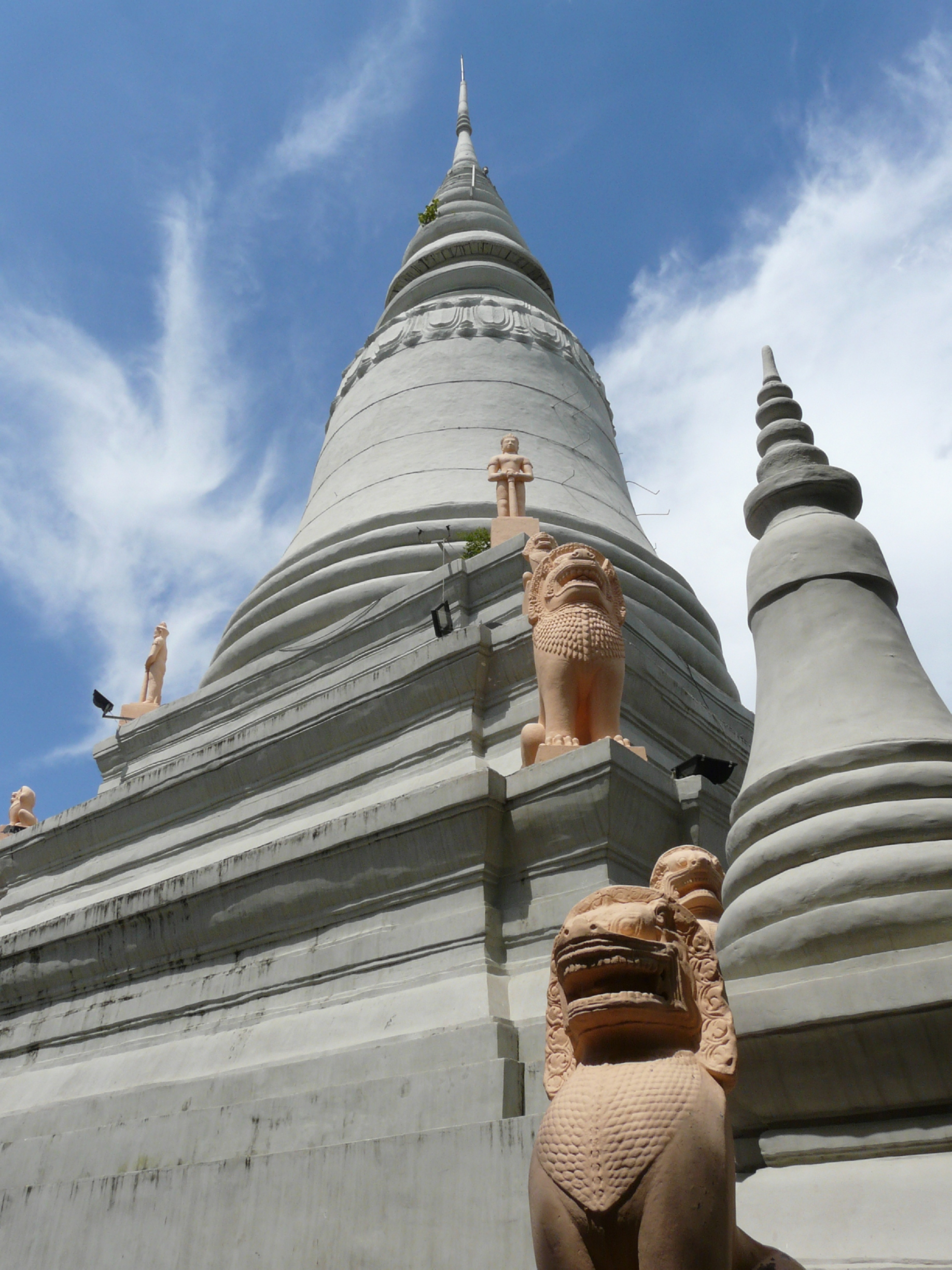
The main stupa on Wat Phnom

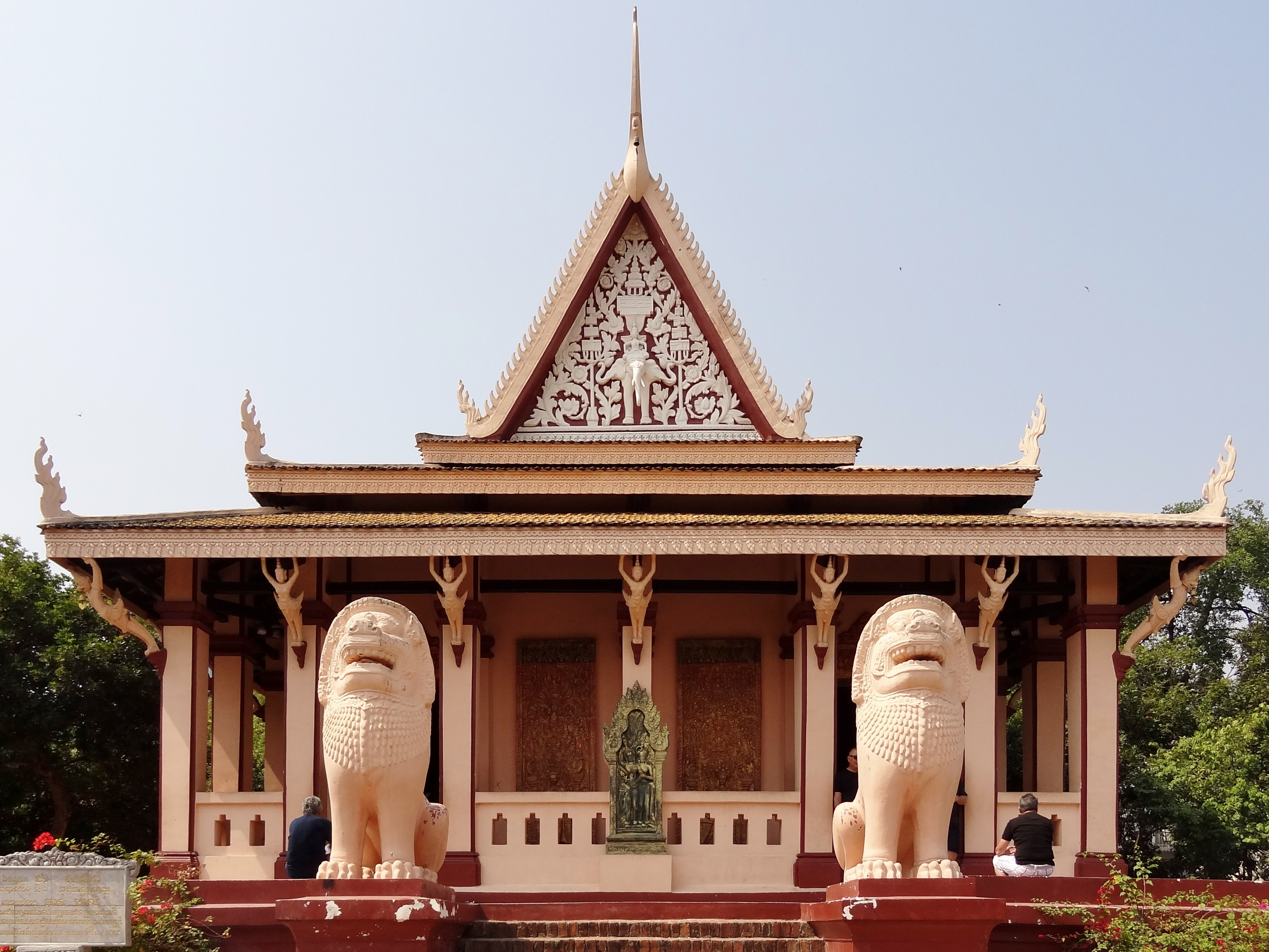
Main pagoda

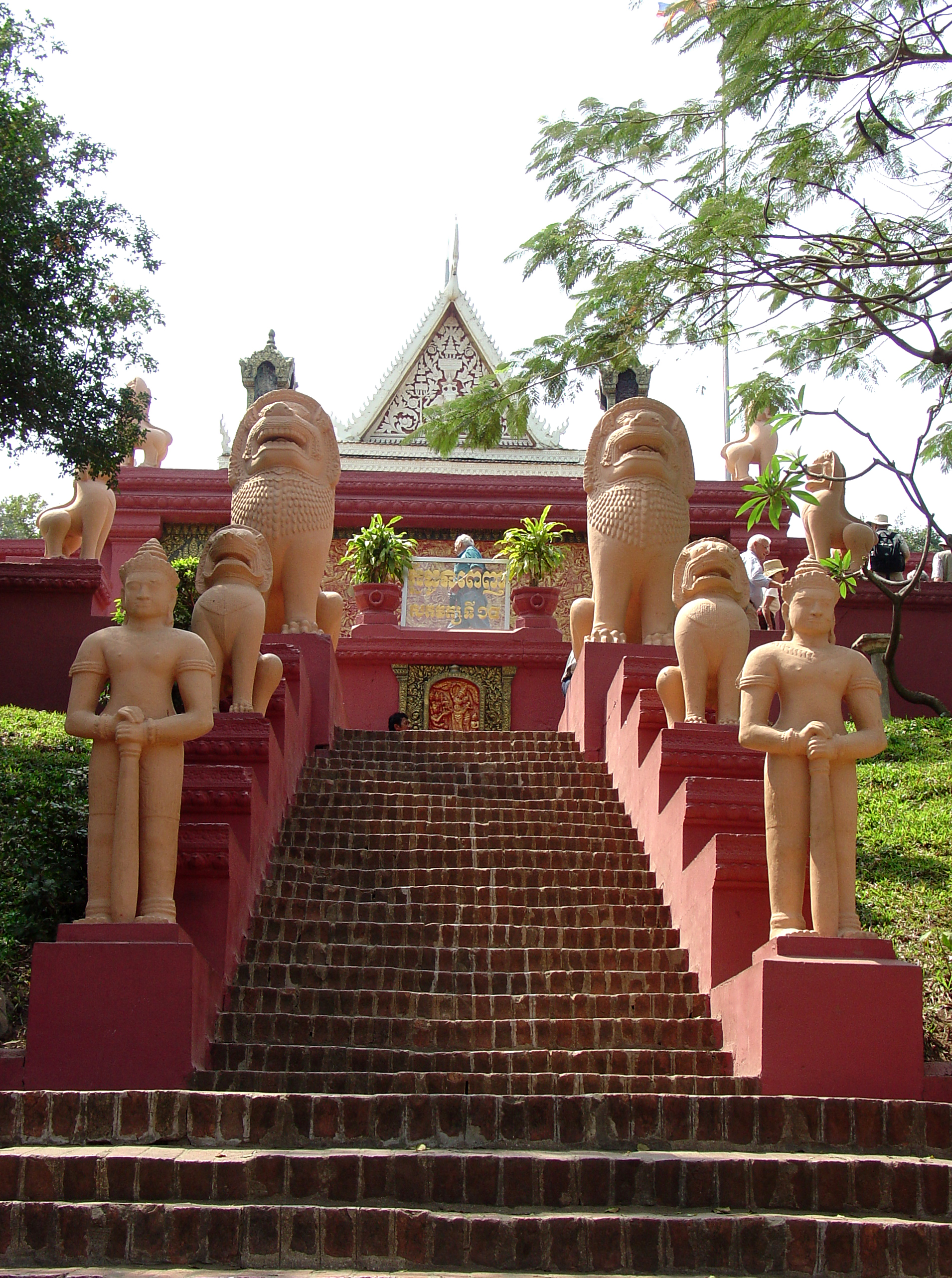
Main stairway leading to the Pagoda

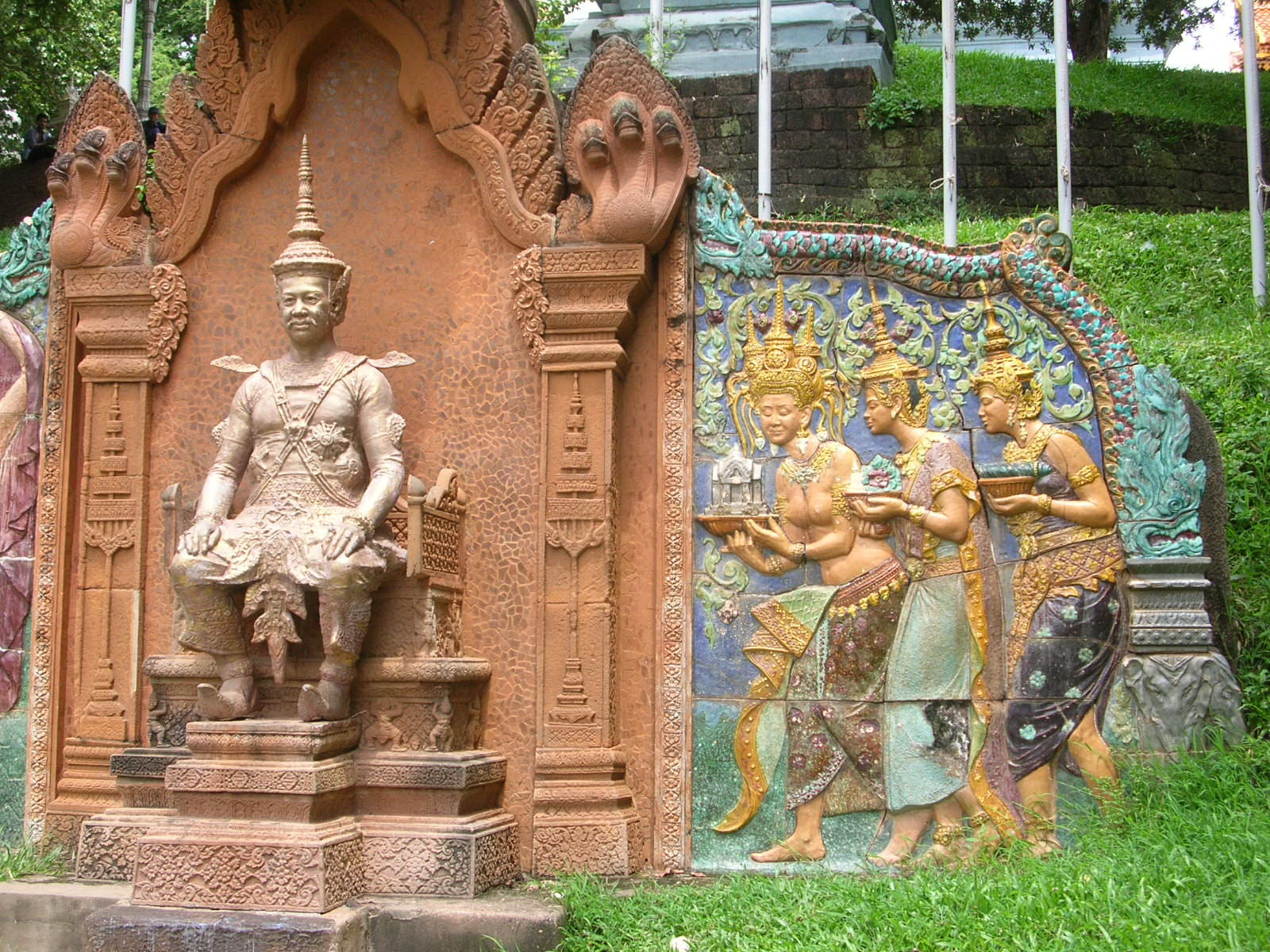
Statue of King Sisowath

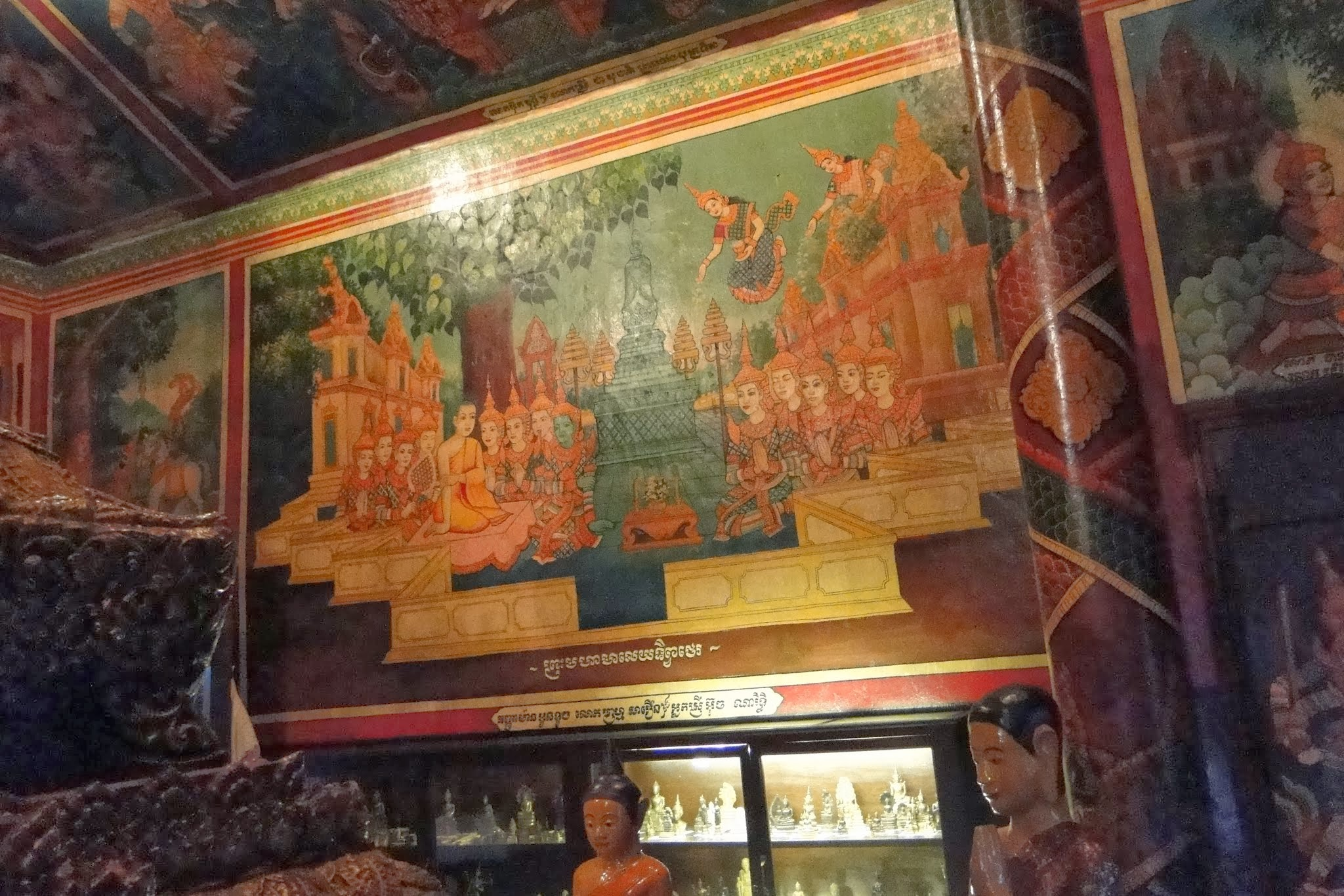
Paintings inside the temple

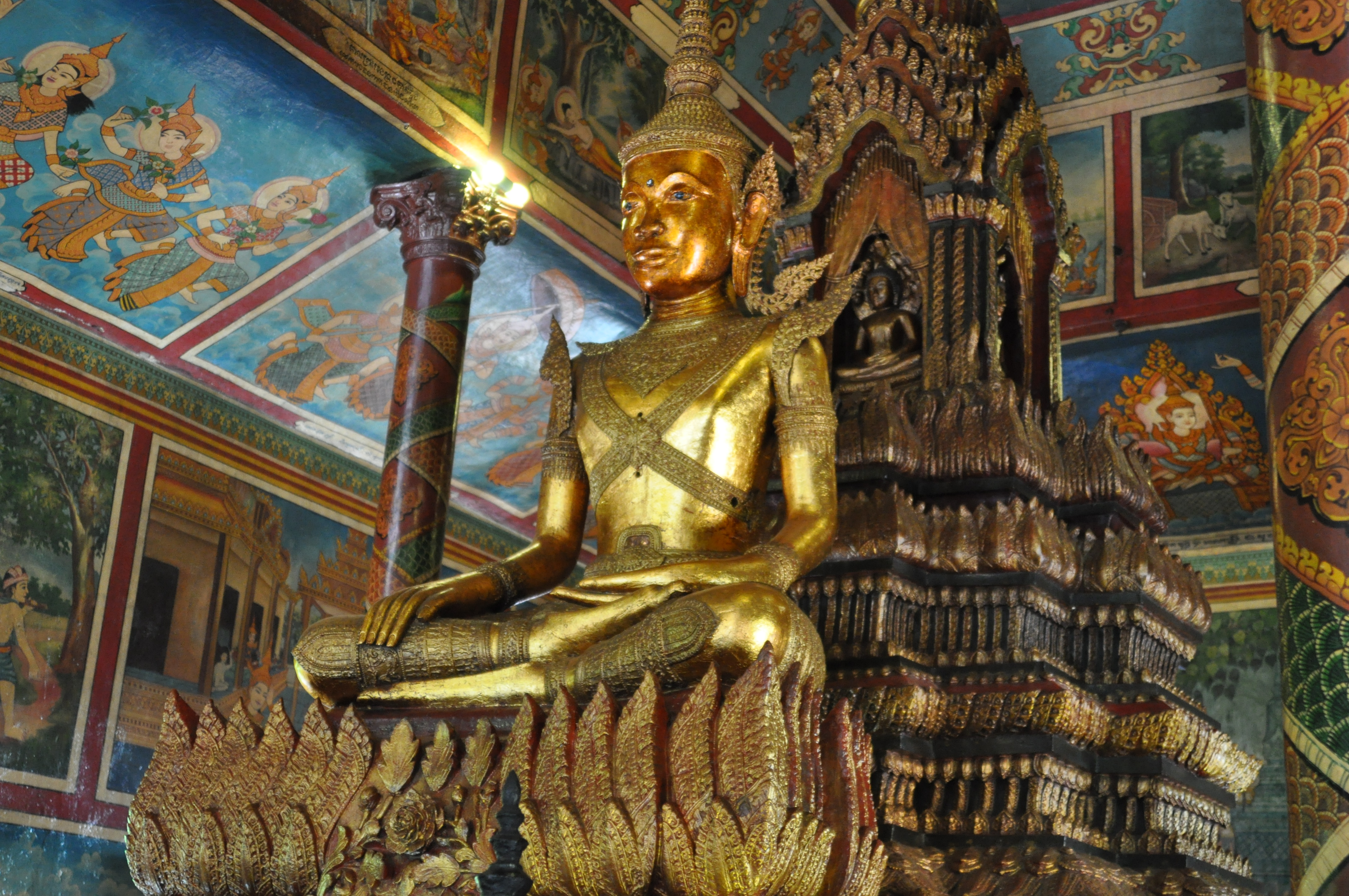
Buddhist shrine inside the pagoda

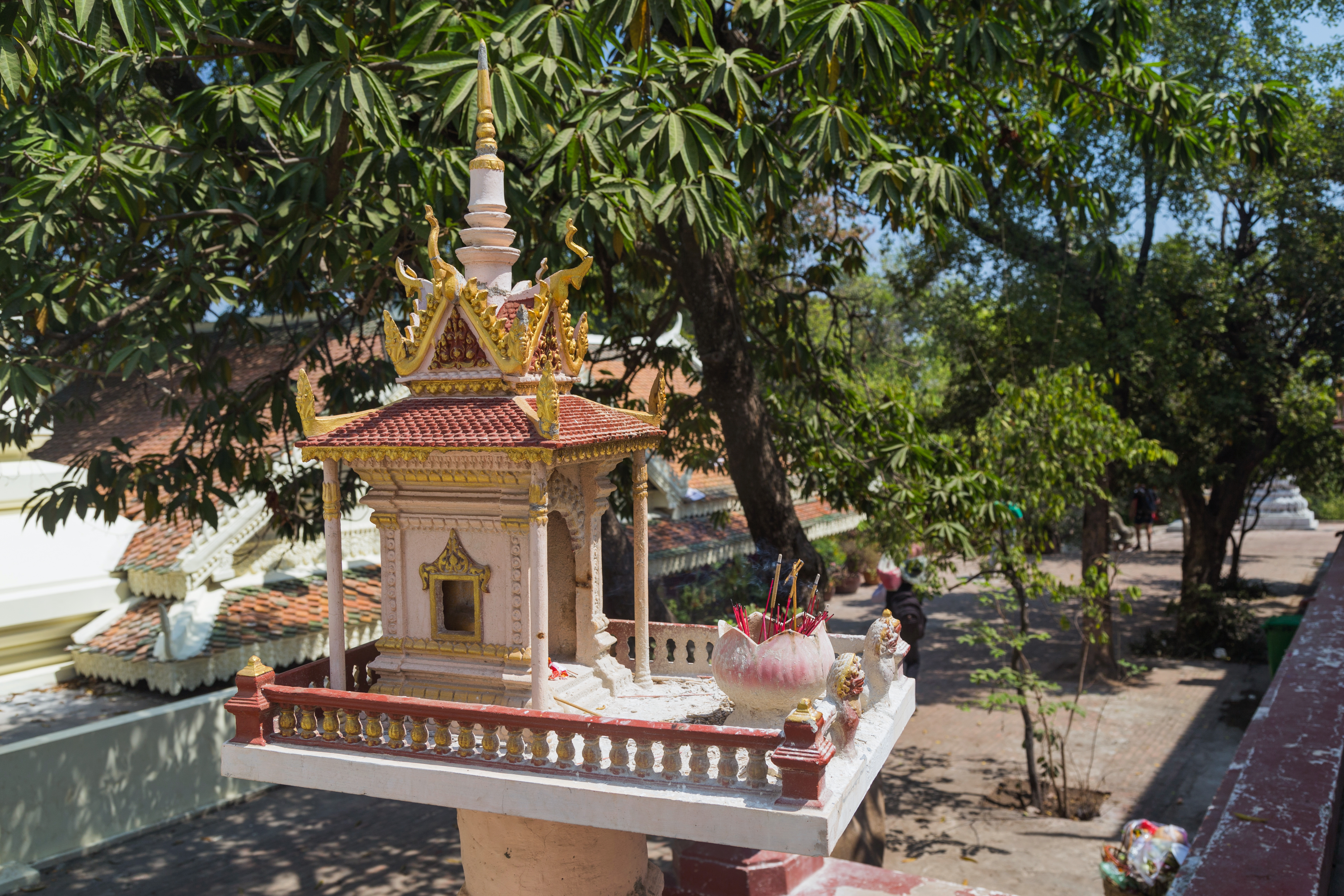
Spirit house

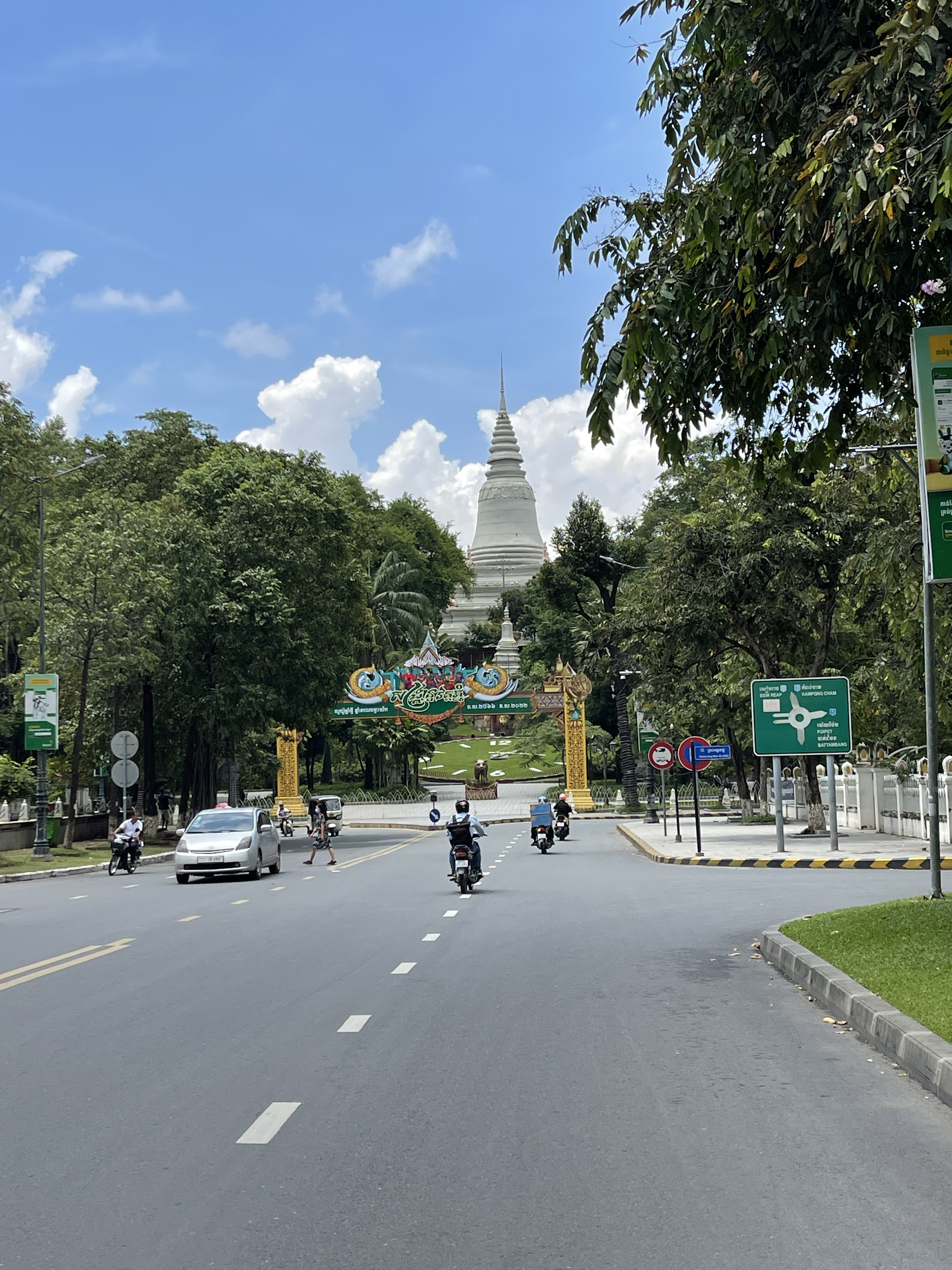
Wat Phnom View from Preah Norodom Blvd

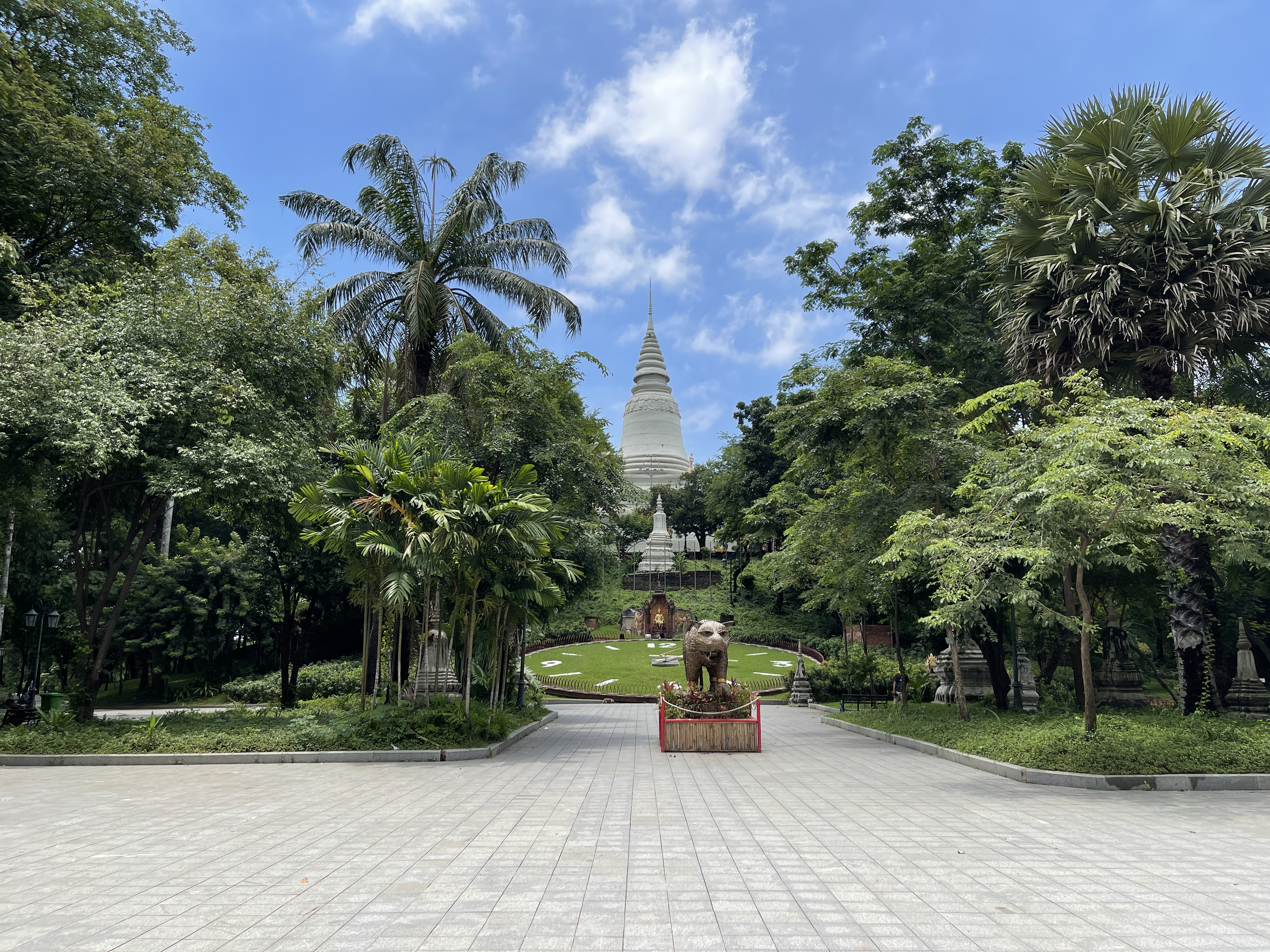
Wat Phnom

== Cultural references ==
Wat Phnom appeared on the Travel Channel documentary, 1,000 Places to See Before You Die. It also served as the Pit Stop for the fourth leg of The Amazing Race 15.

== See also ==
- Wat Botum
- Wat Ounalom
- Silver Pagoda
