= Penh =

Founder of Phnom Penh

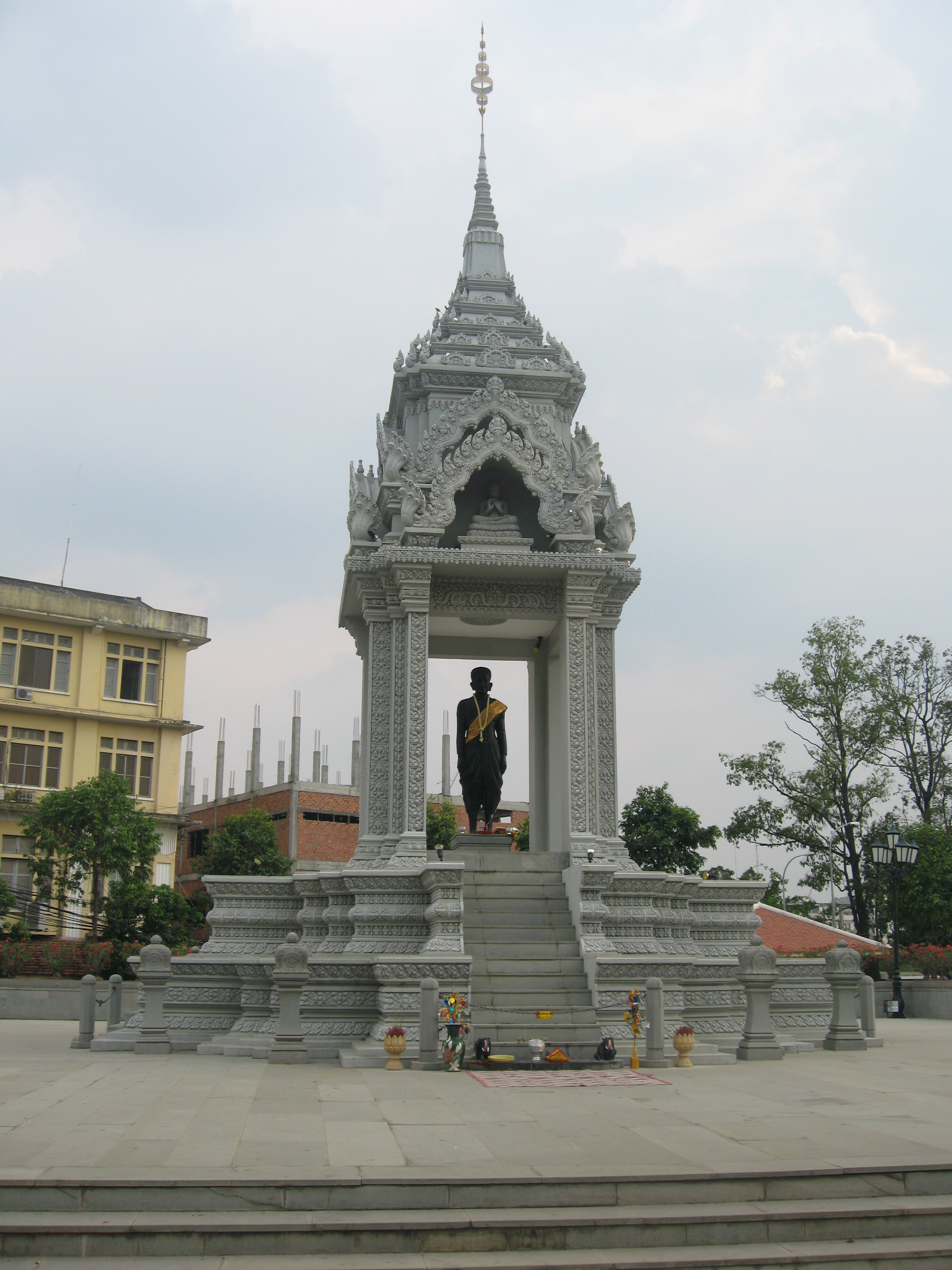
Statue of Lady Penh in Wat Phnom.

Penh (Khmer: ពេញ, romanized: Penh [pɨɲ]), commonly referred to as Daun Penh (Khmer: ដូនពេញ, romanized: Don Penh [doːn pɨɲ]; meaning "Grandmother Penh" or "Old Lady Penh") or Lady Penh, was a wealthy woman who is credited as having founded Phnom Penh, the capital of Cambodia, in 1372 AD.

== Legacy ==
Her statue can be seen near Wat Phnom.
