= Cosmos Holidays =

UK independent tour operator

- Type: Subsidiary
- Industry: Tourism industry
- Founded: 1961; 65 years ago
- Headquarters: Bromley, United Kingdom
- Area served: United Kingdom
- Key people: Lesley Taylor
- Services: Touring holidays
- Parent: Cosmos Tours Ltd
- Website: www.cosmos.co.uk

Cosmos (formerly Cosmos Tours) is a British independent tour operator providing a range of package holidays to the UK market.

The tour operator is connected to the international Globus Travel Group, founded in 1928, which remains family owned with headquarters in Lugano, Switzerland. Under parent company Cosmos Tours Ltd, the tour operator offers holidays through two brands: Cosmos and Avalon Waterways.

Cosmos Holidays was founded in 1961 as Cosmos Tours. It became Cosmos Holidays in 1987. After Globus Travel Group sold Monarch Travel Group to Greybull Capital in October 2014, Monarch stopped using Cosmos as a Monarch Group brand in 2015. However, in March 2017 it was announced that Cosmos Tours had regained full rights and licences to the Cosmos brand and Monarch would change its corporate name from Cosmos Holidays Limited to Monarch Holidays Limited.

== History ==
=== Origins of Cosmos (1928–1986) ===
In 1928, Antonio Mantegazza started a company specialising in coach touring called Globus Viaggi. The company began with a fleet of 12 coaches which operated local excursions for European tourists in Switzerland. By 1950, Globus Viaggi had grown to a fleet of 33 coaches and featured overnight excursions to Rome, Venice, the Dolomites and the French Riviera. Gradually these became regular scheduled tours and grew longer to cover more ground. Later that decade Globus pioneered the concept of Grand European Touring by offering first-class European tours to North Americans.

Cosmos Tours was founded in the UK in 1961 by Sergio Mantegazza. The company was created to provide British customers with affordable package holidays by coach and air travel to Europe. Destinations included Italy, Spain, Switzerland, and Austria by motor coach from London's Victoria station, and by flights from Southend and Lympne airports. Although the company's main programme focused on motor coach tours, it soon increased the choice of air package holidays too. In 1968, the success of the company's air package holidays allowed Cosmos to form the airline Monarch Airlines.

Throughout the 1970s and 1980s, Cosmos Tours increased its UK departure airports to include Manchester, Birmingham, Glasgow, Edinburgh and East Midlands, serving new destinations including Portugal, Yugoslavia, Greece, Malta and Tunisia, and longhaul destinations such as Florida, Thailand and Mexico.

In 1986 Cosmos Tours became the first mainstream operator in the UK to launch a Christmas Lapland programme.

=== Expansion (1987–2009) ===
In 1987, the company changed its name from Cosmos Tours to Cosmos Holidays.

In September 1991, the Globus Travel Group acquired 80% of Avro Plc, a flight-only company set up by Paul Dendle. This acquisition enhanced the company's charter seat-only presence in the market. In 1994, the Globus Group acquired the remaining 20%.

In 1994, Cosmos launched a direct-sell brand, Archers Direct (later Archers Holidays, shut down in November 2018), featuring a worldwide touring programme.

In 2002, Cosmos launched an accommodation-only brand, somewhere2stay, which supplied hotel, apartment and villa accommodation to the UK travel trade. Four years after launching somewhere2stay, sales made up £20-£40 million of an estimated £300-£350 million turnover in the accommodation-only sector. During 2006, the decision was made to run somewhere2stay separately from Cosmos Holidays.

In 2007, Cosmos announced they would introduce package holidays using Monarch's full range of scheduled flights, in line with the expansion plans announced by the airline during the same year.

In 2009, executive chairman, Iain Rawlinson announced plans to reinvent the company as a scheduled carrier, after the company made financial losses. It was predicted at the time that the parent company of Cosmos Holidays would make a loss of around £45 million. During the same year, media coverage suggested there were problems with their approach. The Mantegazza family from Switzerland, which had owned Group Voyagers since its foundation, invested money into the group to cover the losses.

=== Consolidation (2014-present) ===
In 2014, despite the company making the Mantagazza family extremely wealthy, they turned their back on the airline, and in the process, washed their hands of the debt that they owed staff in the form of pension payments. Subsidiaries included Monarch Airlines, Monarch Aircraft Engineering, First Aviation, Cosmos Holidays, somewhere2stay and Avro. On 31 October 2014, the holiday group was sold to venture capitalists, Greybull Capital. Cosmos Tours & Cruises was retained by the Mantegazza Family.

In 2016, Cosmos introduced a private tour programme based on existing tour itineraries in Asia, Africa and India with a private guide/driver included.

From 1 April 2017, the tour operator regained all rights to the brand Cosmos, having reached a formal agreement with Monarch which terminated the licence covering the use of the name.

== Destinations ==
Cosmos provides tours, cruises and rail journeys in over 40 countries, flying from up to 27 UK airports.

The tour operator with its origins in touring in Italy, offers holidays across Europe and the Mediterranean. Other destinations include North America & Canada, Central & South America, Asia and the Far East, Africa, the Persian Gulf, Indian Ocean, Australia and New Zealand. In the 2010s River and ocean cruises were added to the product range in of tours.

== Recognition ==
Cosmos has been shortlisted for travel industry and consumer awards including the TTG Travel Awards, the Globe Travel Awards, British Travel Awards as well as World of Cruising's Wave Awards, and Cruise International's Cruise Awards.
