= Century Cruises =

Travel and holiday companies of China

- Industry: Tourism; Hospitality
- Founded: 1997
- Headquarters: Chongqing, China
- Area served: China, Europe
- Key people: Chen Wei (President)
- Services: River cruises
- Website: centurycruise.com

Century Cruises (Chinese: 世纪游轮), also known as New Century Cruises, is a river cruise line headquartered in Chongqing, China. It provides multi-day cruises on the Yangtze river.

== Destinations ==
Century Cruises offers cruises on the Yangtze river. It offers daily cruises between Chongqing and Yichang. The downstream cruise (Chongqing–Yichang) takes three nights while the upstream cruise (Yichang–Chongqing) takes four nights.

The cruise line occasionally offers cruises between Shanghai and Wuhan, and between Chongqing and Shanghai. Cruises from Chongqing to Shanghai and vice versa takes 14 nights.

== Fleet ==
=== Current fleet ===
Ship	Built	Gross tonnage	Cabins	Passenger capacity	Notes
Century Paragon	2013	12,516	196	400	Occasionally chartered by Uniworld and Avalon Waterways.
Century Legend	2013	12,516	196	400	Occasionally chartered by Uniworld and Avalon Waterways.
Century Glory	2019	15,000	260	650	Century Glory, a river cruise ship built by Century Cruises in with Eco-friendly, hybrid-engines.
Century Victory	2022	15,000	260	650	
Century Oasis	2023	15,000	260	650	

=== Future fleet ===
Ship	Will enter service	Gross tonnage	Cabins	Passenger capacity	Notes
Century Voyager	2024	15,000	260	650	
Century Dream	2026	15,000	260	650	

=== Former ships ===
Ship	Built	Gross tonnage	Cabins	Passenger capacity	Notes	Notes
Century Star	2003	4,255	93	186	Previously chartered by Viking River Cruises.	
Century Sky	2005	8,539	153	306	Previously chartered by Viking River Cruises.	
Century Sun	2006	8,539	153	306	Previously chartered by Viking River Cruises.	
Century Diamond	2008	7,142	132	264	Previously chartered by Nicko Cruises.	
Century Emerald	2010	7,142	132	264	Occasionally chartered by Viking River Cruises.	
