= Group Voyagers =

Group of travel companies

Group Voyagers, Inc.
- Founded: 1928
- Headquarters: Denver, Colorado, United States
- Locale: EU NZ; AU US; CA
- Service type: Package tours
- Chief executive: Sergio Mantegazza
- Website: http://groupvoyagers.com

Group Voyagers, Inc. - also known as the "Globus family of brands", is a group of escorted tour, river cruise and independent travel package companies marketed worldwide. They include the brands Globus, Cosmos, Avalon Waterways.

== Timeline ==
The Globus family of brands traces its history to 1928, when Antonio Mantegazza started using a rowing boat to transport commercial goods across Lake Lugano in Switzerland.

Over time, Mantegazza acquired motorcoaches to transport tourists around the Lake Lugano area in southern Switzerland. Boasting a fleet of 12 coaches, operating local excursions for European tourists in Switzerland, Mantegazza called his new venture Globus Viaggi.

By 1950 the company operated 33 coaches with overnight excursions to Rome, Venice, the Dolomites and French Riviera. Gradually, the overnight excursions became regularly scheduled tours and grew longer to cover more ground. Later that decade, under the leadership of Werner Albek, Antonio’s business partner, Globus pioneered the concept of Grand European Touring by offering first-class European tours to United States citizens.

In 1961 the group launched Cosmos (originally referred to as Cosmos Holidays) in the United Kingdom, offering value-priced European touring for the cost-conscious traveler.

In 1975, Sergio Mantegazza (son of Antonio) became president of Globus. The company's brands began expanding their markets beyond UK with packages to Africa, Australia, North and South America, Southeast Asia, Europe and the South Pacific. Also in the early 70s, Globus launched its North American company – Group Voyagers, Inc. – overseeing U.S. operations and the American market for the Globus and Cosmos brands.

In 2004, Globus launched a cruise company, Avalon Waterways. In the same year it launched Monograms, which provided consumers independent travel packages. This is now simply known as Globus Independent Tours.

== Present ==
The Globus family of brands now consists of more than 30 tourism and aviation businesses, serviced by more than 5,000 staff. The companies’ escorted and independent vacations offer nearly 10,000 departures and over 400 different itineraries, covering more than 65 countries on six continents. Combined, the travel brands carry nearly 500,000 passengers per year, making Globus the largest tour operator worldwide.
