= Patricia Schultz =

American travel writer and author

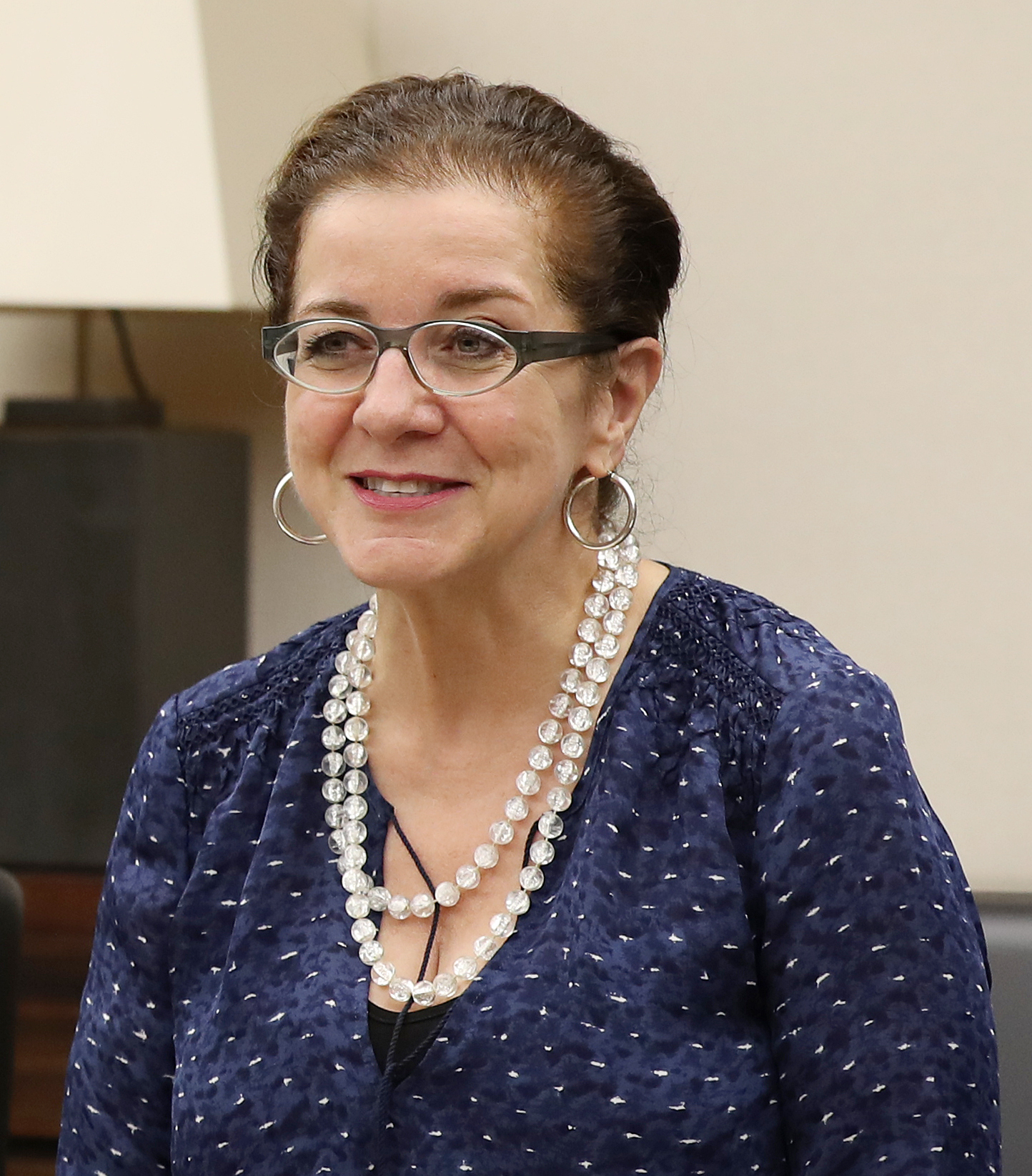
- Schultz in 2016
- Born: c. 1950 (age 74–75); Beacon, New York, US
- Education: Georgetown University
- Occupation: Writer

Patricia Schultz (born c. 1950) is an American travel writer and author. Her books include the bestseller 1,000 Places to See Before You Die, which had over three million copies in print as of 2019.

== Early life ==
Schultz was born and raised in Beacon, New York, a small city in upstate New York beside the Hudson River. She has attributed her love of travel to the childhood family vacations she took with her family, to places on the East Coast. When she was fourteen years old, Schultz spent two weeks in the Dominican Republic while visiting a friend.

Schultz attended Georgetown University, graduating with a degree in linguistics in 1975. During her junior year at Georgetown, she studied away in Madrid, Spain.

After her college graduation, Schultz visited Italy. Although intended to be a short trip, she ended up staying for three years after meeting an Italian man whom she started a relationship with.

== Career ==
Schultz began her career in 1985 as a writer for Frommer’s Guide Books, and worked for the company for a decade.

Schultz is the author of 1,000 Places to See Before You Die. She worked on the book for eight years before publishing it in 2003. A revised edition of the book was released in 2012. In 2007, she published 1,000 Places to See in the USA and Canada Before You Die. In 2019, Schultz reworked 1,000 Places to See Before You Die into a coffee table version, with a focus on photography rather than text. In 2022, she published Why We Travel: 100 Reasons to See the World.

She is also a contributing editor to Travel Weekly.

== Personal life ==
Schultz married her husband, Nick, in 2000. When Schultz first began to travel extensively, she would buy rugs as souvenirs. However, she found that shipping the rugs home, and displaying a large number of them, was too difficult. Instead, she began collecting ornaments for her Christmas tree from the locales she visited.

When asked where she would go if she could take only one more trip, she stated that she would travel to Florence where she would rent an apartment and live as a local.

Schultz lives in New York City.

== Selected publications ==
- Made in Italy: A Shopper's Guide to Florence, Milan, Rome and Venice. with Annie Brody. New York: Workman Publishing, 1988. ISBN 0894803050
- Access Florence and Venice: Plus Tuscany and the Veneto. with Craig Manley, Richard Saul Wurman, and Toni Sepeda. New York: HarperCollins, 1998. ISBN 0062772228
- Frommer's Italy from $70 a Day: The Ultimate Guide to Comfortable Low-Cost Travel. with Reid Bramblett and Stephen Brewer. Hoboken: John Wiley, 1999. ISBN 0028624475
- Berlitz Pocket Guide Milan & the Italian Lakes. Springfield, NJ: Berlitz Publishing, 2001. ISBN 2831578205
- 1,000 Places to See Before You Die. New York: Workman Publishing, 2003. ISBN 0761104844
- Berlitz Pocket Guide Italy. Springfield, NJ: Berlitz Publishing, 2003. ISBN 9812460926
- Berlitz Pocket Guide Rome. Springfield, NJ: Berlitz Publishing, 2003. ISBN 9812682856
- Eyewitness Top 10 Travel Guides: Boston. with David Lyon and Jonathan Schultz. New York: DK Publishing, 2003. ISBN 0789491931
- Berlitz Pocket Guide Florence, 12th edition. Springfield, NJ: Berlitz Publishing, 2005. ISBN 9812465227
- 1,000 Places to See in the USA and Canada Before You Die. New York: Workman Publishing, 2007. ISBN 0761147381
- Perfect Island Getaways from 1,000 Places to See Before You Die: The Caribbean, Bahamas & Bermuda. New York: Workman Publishing, 2011. ISBN 0761165061
- Why We Travel: 100 Reasons to See the World. New York: Workman Publishing, 2022. ISBN 1523510978
