= 1,000 Places to See Before You Die (TV series) =

- Genre: Documentary
- Presented by: Albin and Melanie Ulle
- Country of origin: United States
- Original language: English
- No. of seasons: 1
- No. of episodes: 13

Production
- Executive producer: Casey Brumels
- Running time: 60 min.

Original release
- Network: Travel Channel, Discovery HD Theater (now Velocity HD)
- Release: March 29, 2007

1000 Places to See Before You Die is a travel documentary that was shown on the Travel Channel in 2007. It was first shown March 29. It was also shown on Discovery HD Theater (now Velocity HD) in the same year. It is based on the book 1,000 Places to See Before You Die by Patricia Schultz. The show, hosted by Albin and Melanie Ulle, a couple recruited for the purpose, travels around the world to ~100 of the places mentioned in the book over the course of 5 months. Reviewers have praised its portrayal of its various locales, and criticized the lack of "insightfulness" of the observations of its hosts.

== Discovery HD Theater series (TV video) ==
Collection 1

- 1,000 Places to See Before You Die - Alaska
- 1,000 Places to See Before You Die - Australia
- 1,000 Places to See Before You Die - Brazil
- 1,000 Places to See Before You Die - France
- 1,000 Places to See Before You Die - Hawaii
- 1,000 Places to See Before You Die - Italy

Collection 2

- 1,000 Places to See Before You Die - Cambodia
- 1,000 Places to See Before You Die - Canada
- 1,000 Places to See Before You Die - India
- 1,000 Places to See Before You Die - Mexico
- 1,000 Places to See Before You Die - Nepal
- 1,000 Places to See Before You Die - Peru
- 1,000 Places to See Before You Die - South Africa

== See also ==
- 1,000 Places to See in the USA and Canada Before You Die
- 1,000 Places to See Before You Die
