= Istituto Elvetico Salesiani Don Bosco =

Coordinates: 46.0070531°N 8.9566538°E

Istituto Elvetico Salesiani Don Bosco is an Italian international school, in Lugano, Switzerland. It serves elementary school through liceo ([liˈtʃeːo]: senior high school).

== Accreditation ==
IESDB's (upper) secondary education (Middle and High School) is not approved as a Mittelschule/Collège/Liceo by the Swiss Federal State Secretariat for Education, Research and Innovation (SERI).
