= 1,000 Places to See Before You Die =

2003 travel book

- The new edition, published November 2011
- Author: Patricia Schultz

1,000 Places to See Before You Die is a 2003 travel book by Patricia Schultz, published by Workman.

According to Schultz, she began work on the book in 1995 and finished it about 8 years later. She claims to have visited ~80% of the places she lists in each book.

One reviewer praised its wide ranges and images, but criticized the book for a lack of originality, featuring for example the Eiffel Tower.

== Criticism ==
Criticism included that 1,000 Places to See Before You Die exemplifies a profound degree of US-centricity and American parochialism by fundamentally distorting geography and cultural significance.

Specific criticism included the book falls into the common American mistake of equating a US state with a sovereign country, especially in Europe, dedicating an entire disproportionately massive chapter largely to the United States allowing a single nation to claim hundreds of entries while aggressively compressing the rest of the planet into just three sweeping regional buckets. Under this skewed framework 50 European countries, 54 African countries and 49 Asian countries are excessively compressed and consolidated into single homogenized chapters.

== Other media ==
On March 29, 2007, the Travel Channel premiered a series based on the book's locations, called 1,000 Places to See Before You Die. Patricia Schultz published a follow-up edition in 2007 called 1,000 Places to See in the US and Canada Before You Die, describing her process in creating as more methodical than in the first.

== Summary ==
The book's chapters are broken down by geographical locations. Within each chapter, the entries are further narrowed by region. The chapters are as follows:

- Chapter 1: Europe: includes Great Britain and Ireland, Western Europe, Eastern Europe, and Scandinavia. Entries range from Cambridge University in Cambridgeshire, England to Midsummer Eve in Dalarna, Sweden.
- Chapter 2: Africa: includes North Africa, West Africa, East Africa and Southern Africa, and Islands of the Indian Ocean. Entries for this chapter range from Alexandria, Egypt to Mahé in Seychelles.
- Chapter 3: The Middle East: Entries include Acre (also referred to as Akko) in Israel and Yemen's Shibam.
- Chapter 4: "Asia: From Beijing's Forbidden City to Xi'an's Terra-Cotta Warriors, Japan's Sapporo Snow Festival to Calcutta's Marble Palace, Turkey's Whirling Dervishes to the Mekong Delta in Vietnam"
- Chapter 5: "Australia, New Zealand, and the Pacific Islands: From the Sydney Opera House to Uluru, New Zealand's Tasman Glacier to the Cook Islands' Dance Festival, the Sepik River in Papua New Guinea to Tonga's Heilala Festival"
- Chapter 6: "The United States and Canada: From Alaska's Inside Passage to Savannah's Historic District, the Art Institute in Chicago to the French Quarter in New Orleans, the Las Vegas Strip to New York's Finger Lakes Region, Monticello in Virginia to Jackson Hole in Wyoming, Skating the Rideau Canal in Ottawa to Heli-Skiing in British Columbia"
- Chapter 7: "Latin America: From the Mayan Ruins of Palenque in Mexico to Belize's Barrier Reef, the San Blas Archipelago of Panama to Buenos Aires' Tango Bars, Chile's Wine Region to the Otavolo Market in Ecuador, Machu Picchu in Peru to the Penguin Rookeries of Antarctica"
- Chapter 8: "The Caribbean, Bahamas, and Bermuda: From Cap Juluca in Anguilla to the Shark Rodeo at Walker's Cay in the Bahamas, Cuba's Jazz Festival to Sailing the Grenadines, Old San Juan in Puerto Rico to Saba National Marine Park"

== Editions ==
- Patricia Schultz. 1,000 Places to See Before You Die, Updated Edition, Workman 2010. ISBN 0-7611-6102-3
- Patricia Schultz. 1,000 Places to See Before You Die in the US and Canada, Workman 2007
- Patricia Schultz. 1,000 Places to See Before You Die, Workman 2003. ISBN 0-7611-0484-4
