= Travel Trade Gazette =

Travel industry weekly newspaper

- Type: Weekly newspaper
- Owner: TTG Media Limited
- Founder(s): Leslie Stone and Ted Kirkham
- Founded: 1953
- Language: English
- Headquarters: London
- ISSN: 0262-4397
- Website: www.ttgmedia.com

Travel Trade Gazette (UK & Ireland edition), known as TTG, is a weekly newspaper for the travel industry.

TTG was launched in 1953 by Leslie Stone and Ted Kirkham and is the world's oldest travel trade newspaper. It includes news, destination reports and careers advice for the travel and tourism industries. Sectors covered include travel agents, tour operators, airlines, cruise companies, hotels, tourist boards, rail travel, ferry lines, business travel and web-based operators.

The paper has an audited circulation of 17,099 and is distributed via subscription and controlled circulation to high street travel agents, homeworker agents, call centres, tour operators and other travel organisations. It is published on Thursdays.

TTG also publishes ttgluxury, a quarterly publication for the luxury travel sector, and bespoke supplements as well as running several events including the TTG Travel Awards, TTG Top 50 Travel Agencies, TTG on Tour roadshows, TTG LGBT travel events and ttgluxury seminars. Since 2012 TTG has also produced the WTM show dailies, for London's World Travel Market, magazines that are distributed on each day of WTM London to over 50,000 attendees.

The paper's website includes news, competitions, photo galleries and job vacancies.

TTG employs about 25 staff and is published by TTG Media Limited. It is based at TTG's head office New Bridge Street House, 30-34 New Bridge Street, London EC4V 6BJ

In 2013, former editor Daniel Pearce completed a management buy-out from parent company UBM, setting up TTG Media Ltd.

TTG is also published under licence in the Middle East and North Africa, Russia, the Czech Republic, Italy and Poland.

== Competitors ==
The main competitors of TTG are Travel Weekly and Travel Bulletin in print and online, and Travelmole.
