= List of cruise lines =

A cruise line is a company that operates cruise ships and markets cruises to the public. Cruise lines are distinct from passenger lines which are primarily concerned with transportation of their passengers. Cruise lines have a dual character; they are partly in the transportation business, and partly in the leisure entertainment business, a duality that carries down into the ships themselves, which have both a crew headed by the ship's captain, and a hospitality staff headed by the equivalent of a hotel manager.

Because of mergers and consolidations, a cruise line may also be a brand of a larger holding corporation. For example, as noted below, Carnival Cruise Line and Holland America Line are cruise lines within the larger parent corporation Carnival Corporation. This industry practice of using the brand, not the larger parent corporation, as the cruise line is also followed in the member cruise lines in Cruise Lines International Association (CLIA); the listing of cruise ship sales, transfers, and new orders; cruise line market share; and the member-based reviews of cruise lines.

Cruise ships can cruise in oceans or rivers. The listing of cruise lines below includes separate lists for both areas. Cruise lines operating ocean and river ships can be found in both lists.

== List of cruise lines by passengers ==
As of 2025, the cruise industry was estimated to be around US$72.5 billion with 72.5 million passengers per year. The following is a list of the largest cruise lines with over 1,000 passengers per year and their market share by passengers and revenue as of 2025 according to Cruise Market Watch. The list also includes the combined market share of each of the cruise line holding companies: Carnival Corporation, Royal Caribbean Group, Mediterranean Shipping Company, Norwegian Cruise Line Holdings and TUI Group.

Legend:

- Bold: Major cruise company
- Italic: Subsidiary of a major cruise company

Cruise line	Parent company	Headquarters	Passengers		Revenue	
Cruise line	Parent company	Headquarters	(thousands)	%	(US$ millions)	%
**Carnival Corporation**		United Kingdom / United States	**13,987.0**	**41.5**	**26,130.00**	**36.0**
Carnival Cruise Line	Carnival Corporation	United States	6,762.0	20.1	7,294.30	10.1
Princess Cruises	Carnival Corporation	United States	1,942.9	5.8	4,503.40	6.2
P&O Cruises	Carnival Corporation	United Kingdom	1,464.9	4.4	3,964.30	5.5
Costa Cruises	Carnival Corporation	Italy	1,412.6	4.2	2,464.30	3.4
AIDA Cruises	Carnival Corporation	Germany	1,085.8	3.2	2,938.30	4.1
Holland America Line	Carnival Corporation	United States	809.8	2.4	2,526.70	3.5
Cunard Line	Carnival Corporation	United Kingdom	434.6	1.3	1,492.60	2.1
Seabourn Cruise Line	Carnival Corporation	United States	74.4	0.2	946.10	1.3
**Royal Caribbean Group**		United States	**9,105.3**	**27.0**	**18,010.00**	**24.8**
Royal Caribbean	Royal Caribbean Group	United States	7,150.1	21.2	10,765.40	14.8
Celebrity Cruises	Royal Caribbean Group	United States	1,761.4	5.2	4,507.70	6.2
Silversea Cruises	Royal Caribbean Group	Monaco	193.8	0.6	2,736.90	3.8
**Mediterranean Shipping Company**		Switzerland	**3,447.9**	**10.2**	**5,474.6**	**7.5**
MSC Cruises	Mediterranean Shipping Company	Switzerland	3,375.3	10.0	5,296.30	7.3
Explora Journeys	Mediterranean Shipping Company	Switzerland	72.6	0.2	178.30	0.2
**Norwegian Cruise Line Holdings**		United States	**3,160.8**	**9.4**	**10,220.10**	**14.1**
Norwegian Cruise Line	Norwegian Cruise Line Holdings	United States	2,861.5	8.5	6,946.00	9.6
Oceania Cruises	Norwegian Cruise Line Holdings	United States	183.9	0.5	1,588.00	2.2
Regent Seven Seas Cruises	Norwegian Cruise Line Holdings	United States	115.4	0.3	1,686.10	2.3
Disney Cruise Line	Disney Experiences	United States	1,039.10	3.1	2,827.90	3.9
**TUI Cruises**	**TUI Group (50%) and Royal Caribbean Group (50%)**	Germany	**862.7**	**2.5**	**2,119.00**	**2.8**
TUI Cruises	TUI Cruises	Germany	574.3	1.7	1,410.60	1.9
Marella Cruises	TUI Cruises	United Kingdom	247.9	0.7	608.90	0.8
Hapag-Lloyd Cruises	TUI Cruises	Germany	40.5	0.1	99.50	0.1
Viking Ocean Cruises	Viking Holdings	Switzerland	254.8	0.8	3,011.50	4.2
Virgin Voyages	Virgin Group	United States	295.0	0.9	724.50	1.0
Resorts World Cruises	Genting Malaysia Berhad	Singapore	277.5	0.8	681.30	0.9
Hurtigruten	Hurtigruten	Norway	175.1	0.5	430.00	0.6
Adora Cruises	China State Shipbuilding Corporation	China	169.4	0.5	416.10	0.5
Fred. Olsen Cruise Lines	Bonheur	United Kingdom	107.8	0.3	264.70	0.4
Margaritaville at Sea	Jimmy Buffett's Margaritaville	United States	93.7	0.3	230.00	0.3
Celestyal Cruises	Searchlight Capital	Greece	92.5	0.3	227.30	0.3
Ponant Cruises	Groupe Artémis	France	74.3	0.2	182.60	0.3
Azamara Cruises	Sycamore Partners	United States	62.7	0.2	443.30	0.6
Phoenix Reisen	Phoenix Reisen	Germany	59.0	0.2	144.90	0.2
Saga Cruises	Saga plc	United Kingdom	53.2	0.2	130.60	0.2
Windstar Cruises	The Anschutz Corporation	United States	47.0	0.1	115.50	0.2
Crystal Cruises	A&K Travel Group	United States	35.8	0.1	88.00	0.1
Mystic Cruises	MysticInvest Holding	Portugal	33.5	0.1	82.40	0.1
Lindblad Expeditions	Lindblad Expeditions	United States	30.4	0.1	74.50	0.1
The Ritz-Carlton Yacht Collection	The Ritz-Carlton Hotel Company	United States	29.7	0.1	72.80	0.1
American Cruise Lines	American Cruise	United States	27.7	0.1	68.00	0.1
Atlas Ocean Voyages	MysticInvest Holding	Portugal	26.1	0.1	64.10	0.1
Star Clippers	Star Clippers Ltd	United Kingdom	22.3	0.1	54.90	0.1
Quark Expeditions	Travelopia	United States	22.3	0.1	54.70	0.1
Swan Hellenic	Andrea Zito	United Kingdom	13.2	0.0	32.40	0.0
Scenic Luxury Cruises	Glen Moroney	United Kingdom	12.1	0.1	29.80	0.1
MOL Mitsui Ocean Cruises	Mitsui O.S.K. Lines	Japan	12.0	0.0	29.90	0.0
American Queen Voyages	Closed	United States	11.6	0.0	28.50	0.0
Emerald Cruises	Scenic Group	Switzerland	8.7	0.0	21.50	0.0
SeaDream Yacht Club	Atle Brynestad	Norway	6.0	0.0	14.70	0.0
Four Seasons Yachts	Four Seasons Hotels and Resorts	Canada	5.5	0.0	13.40	0.0
Hebridean Island Cruises	Rob Barlow	United Kingdom	2.7	0.0	6.50	0.0
Total			33,664,600	100%	72,520.00	100%

== List of ocean cruise lines ==
=== Operational ===
List of operational ocean cruise lines
Name	Owner	Headquarters	Notes
Adora Cruises	China Cruises Limited	China	Carnival Corp. & plc remains a minority shareholder
AIDA Cruises	Carnival Corporation	Germany	
American Cruise Lines	American Cruise	United States	River cruises, coastal cruises and paddle-steamer cruises. Based in Guilford, Connecticut
Ambassador Cruise Line	Njord Partners	United Kingdom	
Atlas Ocean Voyages	MysticInvest Holding	Portugal	Small cruise ships
Aurora Expeditions		Australia	Expedition cruising. Operates arctic cruises with Polar Pioneer
Azamara Cruises	Sycamore Partners	United States	
Carnival Cruise Line	Carnival Corporation	United States	
Celebrity Cruises	Royal Caribbean Group	United States	
Celestyal Cruises	Searchlight Capital	Greece	
Club Med	Club Med	France	Based in Paris, operates Club Med 2 staysail schooner
Costa Cruises	Carnival Corporation	Italy	
Crystal Cruises	A&K Travel Group	United States	
Cunard Line	Carnival Corporation	United Kingdom	
Disney Cruise Line	Disney Experiences	United States	
Dream Cruises	Resorts World Cruises	Malaysia	Ceased operations after Genting Hong Kong declared bankruptcy due to the Coronavirus pandemic. Restarted in as a brand of Resorts World Cruises.
Explora Journeys	Mediterranean Shipping Company	Switzerland	
Four Seasons Yachts	Four Seasons Hotels and Resorts	Canada	Yachts and small cruise ships
Fred. Olsen Cruise Lines	Bonheur	United Kingdom	
Hapag-Lloyd Cruises	TUI Group	Germany	
Hebridean Island Cruises	Rob Barlow	United Kingdom	Yachts and small cruise ships
Heritage Expeditions		New Zealand	Expedition cruising
Holland America Line	Carnival Corporation	United States	
Hurtigruten	Hurtigruten	Norway	Also marketed as Norwegian Coastal Express
Lindblad Expeditions	Lindblad Expeditions	United States	Expedition cruising
Majestic Line		United Kingdom	Yachts and small cruise ships. Offers Scottish island cruises
Mano Maritime		Israel	
Marella Cruises	TUI Group	United Kingdom	
Margaritaville at Sea	Jimmy Buffett's Margaritaville	United States	
MOL Mitsui Ocean Cruises	Mitsui O.S.K. Lines	Japan	
MSC Cruises	Mediterranean Shipping Company	Switzerland	
Mystic Cruises	MysticInvest Holding	Portugal	
Norwegian Cruise Line	Norwegian Cruise Line Holdings	United States	
Oceania Cruises	Norwegian Cruise Line Holdings	United States	
Oceanwide Expeditions		Netherlands	
Phoenix Reisen	Zurnieden family (private)	Germany	
Ponant Cruises	Groupe Artémis	France	
P&O Cruises	Carnival Corporation	United Kingdom	
Paul Gauguin Cruises		United States	Branch of Regent Seven Seas Cruises till 2010, offers South Pacific cruises
Pearl Seas Cruises		United States	Small cruise ships. Offers Great Lakes, New England and Cuba cruises
Poseidon Expeditions		United Kingdom	Expedition cruising. Arctic cruises with nuclear icebreaker 50 Let Pobedy
Princess Cruises	Carnival Corporation	United States	
Quark Expeditions		United States	Expedition cruising
Regent Seven Seas Cruises	Norwegian Cruise Line Holdings	United States	
Resorts World Cruises	Genting Malaysia Berhad	Singapore	
The Ritz-Carlton Yacht Collection	The Ritz-Carlton Hotel Company	United States	Yachts and small cruise ships
Royal Caribbean International	Royal Caribbean Group	United States	
Saga Cruises	Saga plc	United Kingdom	
Sail Croatia		United Kingdom	Yachts and small cruise ships
Scenic Luxury Cruises	Glen Moroney	United Kingdom	Expedition and small cruise ships
Seabourn Cruise Line	Carnival Corporation	United States	
SeaDream Yacht Club	Atle Brynestad (private)	Norway	Yachts and small cruise ships
Silversea Cruises	Royal Caribbean Group	Monaco	
Star Clippers	Star Clippers Ltd	United Kingdom	Yachts and small cruise ships
StarCruises	Resorts World Cruises	Malaysia	Ceased operations after Genting Hong Kong declared bankruptcy due to the Coronavirus pandemic. Restarted in as a brand of Resorts World Cruises.
Swan Hellenic	Andrea Zito	United Kingdom	Expedition cruising
TUI Cruises	TUI Group and Royal Caribbean Group	Germany	
UnCruise Adventures		United States	Small cruise ships
Variety Cruises		Greece	Yachts and small cruise ships
Viking Line		Finland	Cruiseferries
Viking Ocean Cruises	Viking Holdings	Switzerland	Small cruise ships
Virgin Voyages	Virgin Group	United States	
Windstar Cruises	The Anschutz Corporation	United States	Yachts and small cruise ships

=== Defunct ===
List of defunct ocean cruise lines
Name	Headquarters	Notes
Admiral Cruises	United States	Defunct 1992. Acquired by Royal Caribbean Group. in 1988 but ceased operations in 1992.
American Classic Voyages	United States	Defunct 2001. Bankrupt
Birka Cruises	Finland	Defunct 2020. Subsidiary of Rederiaktiebolaget Eckerö, operated the Birka Gotland. After 49 years on the Baltic Sea, ceased operations due to the Coronavirus pandemic on July 20, 2020
Blue Star Line	United Kingdom	Defunct 1998. Merged and sold into P&O Nedlloyd
Celebration Cruise Line	United States	Defunct 2015.
Chandris Cruises	Greece	Defunct 1996.
Classic International Cruises	Australia	Defunct 2012. Liquidated
Commodore Cruise Line	United States	Defunct 2001. Bankrupt
Croisières de France	France	Defunct 2017.
Crown Cruise Line	United States	Defunct 2001.
Cruise & Maritime Voyages	United Kingdom	Defunct 2020. Ceased operations due to the Coronavirus pandemic
Cruise West	United States	Defunct 2010.
Cunard-White Star Line	United Kingdom	Absorbed into Cunard Line in 1949
Dolphin Cruise Lines	Greece	Defunct 1997. Merged into Premier Cruise Line
Eastern Cruise Lines	United States	Defunct 1955. Name revived in 1965 and merged into Admiral Cruises in 1986
EasyCruise	Greece	Defunct 2010. Sold to Hellenic Seaways
Effoa	Finland	Defunct 1990.
Epirotiki Line	Greece	Defunct 1995. Merged its operations with Sun Line. Most well known for losing three of its cruise ships between 1988 and 1991, including the MTS Oceanos in 1991
Fathom	United States	Defunct 2019.
Festival Cruises	Greece	Defunct 2004. Bankrupt
Hamburg Atlantic Line; German Atlantic Line; Hanseatic Tours	Germany	Defunct 1997. Merged into Hapag-Lloyd Cruises
Home Lines	Italy	Defunct 1988. Merged into Holland America Line
Ibero Cruises	Spain	Defunct 2014. Merged into Costa Cruises
Imperial Majesty Cruise Line	United States	Defunct 2009. Became Celebration Cruise Line
Island Cruises	United Kingdom	Defunct 2015.
Italian Line / Italian Cruises	Italy	Defunct 2002.
Majesty Cruise Line	Norway	Defunct 1997. Merged into Norwegian Cruise Line
Norwegian America Line	Norway	Defunct 1995. Merged into Cunard Line
Norwegian Capricorn Line	Australia	Defunct 2000. Merged into Star Cruises
Ocean Village	United Kingdom	Defunct 2010.
Orient Lines	United States	Defunct 2008.
Orion Expedition Cruises	Australia	Defunct 2013. Taken over by and merged with Lindblad Expeditions
P&O Cruises Australia	Australia	Defunct 2025. Merged into Carnival Cruise Line
Peter Deilmann Cruises	Germany	Defunct 2015.
Polar Star Expeditions	Canada	Defunct 2011. Ceased operations after major damage to MV Polar Star
Premier Cruise Lines	United States	Defunct 1993.
Pullmantur Cruises	Spain	Defunct 2020. Ceased operations due to the Coronavirus pandemic
Renaissance Cruises	United States	Defunct 2001.
Royal Viking Line	Norway	Defunct 1998. Merged into Cunard Line
Sally Cruise	Finland	Defunct 1992. Merged into Silja Line
Shaw, Savill & Albion Line	United Kingdom	Defunct 1975.
Sitmar Cruises	Italy	Defunct 1988. Merged into Princess Cruises
Swedish American Line	Sweden	Defunct 1984.
Transocean Tours	Germany	Defunct 2020. German branch of Cruise & Maritime Voyages. Ceased operations due to the Coronavirus pandemic
Van Gogh Cruises	United Kingdom	Defunct 2009.
Western Cruise Lines	United States	Defunct 1986. Merged into Admiral Cruises
White Star Line	United Kingdom	Defunct 1934. Merged with Cunard Line to form Cunard-White Star Line
Windjammer Barefoot Cruises	United States	Defunct 2007. Bankrupt

=== Shipping line still in service ===
The following is a list of defunct ocean cruise lines where their shipping line is still in service.

Name	Status	Headquarters	Notes
Baltic Shipping Company	No longer operates cruise ships	Russia	Engaging in construction of 116 vessels for various purposes including 4 passenger ferries
Black Sea Shipping Company	No ships in operation	Ukraine	
Club Cruise	No longer operates cruise ships	Netherlands	Continues to charter cruise ships to other companies
Far East Shipping Company	No longer operates cruise ships	Russia	Operator of marine shipping, roll-on/roll-off, rail transportation and port handling.
Finnlines	No longer operates cruise ships	Finland	Operator of ro-ro and passenger services
Kristina Cruises	No ships in operation	Finland	Last cruise ship Kristina Katarina sold off in 2013. Company is concentrating on selling cruises on other ships as a tour operator
Majestic International Cruises	No ships in operation	Greece	
Ocean Cruise Line	No ships in operation	United States	
Ocean Star Cruises	No ships in operation	Mexico	Last cruise ship Ocean Star Pacific sold for scrap in 2014
Silja Line	No longer operates cruise ships	Finland	Operator of cruiseferrys

== List of river cruise lines ==
=== Operational river lines ===
The following is a list of operational river cruise lines.

Name	Headquarters	Notes
1AVista	Germany	River cruises in Europe
AmaWaterways	United States	River cruises in Europe, Asia and Africa
American Cruise Lines	United States	Paddle-steamer cruises on US rivers
Aqua Expeditions	Peru	Privately owned by Francesco Galli Zugaro, eco-friendly river cruises on Amazon and Mekong rivers
A-ROSA Flussschiff	Germany	River cruises in Europe, offered ocean-going cruises with A-Rosa blu 2002–04
Australian Pacific Touring (APT)	Australia	Privately owned (McGeary family), river cruises in Europe, Asia and Africa, shares many ships with AmaWaterways
Avalon Waterways	United States	River cruises in Europe, Egypt, Asia and South America
Century Cruises	China	Operates along the Yangtze river
CroisiEurope	France	Privately owned (Schmitter family), river cruises in Europe and Asia
Crystal Cruises	United States	Owned by Genting Hong Kong, river cruises in Europe
DouroAzul	Portugal	Owned by Mystic Invest, river cruises in the Douro, Portugal
Emerald Cruises	Switzerland	
Emerald Waterways	United States	Owned by Australian river cruise operator Scenic, river cruises in Europe and Asia
European Waterways	United Kingdom	Operates converted trading barges on European Rivers
Grand Circle Cruise Line	United States	Owned by Grand Circle Corporation, river cruises in Europe
Great Lakes Cruise Company	United States	Privately owned (Conlin family), Great Lakes and river cruises in USA and Canada
Hansa Touristk	Germany	Privately owned (Kilian family), offers ocean and river cruises (Europe, Asia)
Heritage Line	Vietnam	River cruises in Asia
Lüftner Cruises	Austria	Privately owned (Lüftner family), river cruises in Europe
Nicko Cruises	Germany	Owned by Mystic Invest, river cruises in Europe and Asia
Orthodox Cruise Company	Russia	River cruises in Russia
Pandaw River Expeditions	Vietnam	River cruises in Asia
Paradise Cruises	Vietnam	Ha Long Bay
Phoenix Reisen	Germany	Privately owned (Zurnieden family), river cruises in Europe, Egypt, Asia and South America
Plantours Kreuzfahrten	Germany	Offers ocean and river cruises (Europe, Asia)
President Cruises	China	Operates along the Yangtze river
Reisebüro Mittelthurgau	Switzerland	Owned by Twerenbold Group, river cruises in Europe
Riviera Travel (DBA Riviera River Cruises)	United Kingdom	Luxury river cruises in Europe on the Rhone, Rhine, Danube, Douro, Seine, Main and Moselle. Travel Brand of the Year 2017.
Sanctuary Retreats	United Kingdom	River cruises in Asia
Scenic	Australia	Owned by coach tour operator Transit Scenic Tours, river cruises in Europe and Asia
Tauck River Cruises	United States	Privately owned (Tauck family), river cruises in Europe
The River Cruise Line	United Kingdom	River cruises in Europe
Uniworld River Cruises	United States	River cruises in Europe, Egypt and Asia
Victoria Cruises	United States	The only American-based cruise line operating along the Yangtze River
Victoria Mekong Cruises	Vietnam	Partnership between Vietnam-based hospitality managers Thien Minh Group and Wendy Wu Tours
Viking River Cruises	Switzerland	River cruise line of Viking Cruises with operating HQ in Basel, Switzerland, marketing HQ in USA (California)
Viva River Cruises	Switzerland	Owned by Scylla AG (Tauck), river cruises in Europe
Vodohod	Russia	Owned by UCL Holding, river cruises in Russia
Yangtze Gold Cruises	China	Operates along the Yangtze River
Sardinha do Tejo	Portugal	Operates in Tejo River

=== Defunct river lines ===
The following is a list of defunct river cruise lines.

Name	Headquarters	Notes
American Queen Steamboat Company	United States	Ceased operations in Feb 2024. 4 riverboats sold to American Cruise Lines in Apr 2024.
DDSG	Austria	
Transocean Tours	Germany	From 2014 to 2021, German branch of Cruise & Maritime Voyages, Ceased operations due to the Coronavirus pandemic July 2020
TUI FlussGenuss	Germany	Former river cruise branch of TUI Group, ceased operations in 2014

== See also ==
- List of ferry operators
- List of cruise ships
- List of largest cruise ships
