= Rudi Schreiner =

Austrian-born river cruise executive and co-founder of AmaWaterways

- Born: Vienna, Austria
- Occupation: Cruise line executive
- Known for: Co-founding AmaWaterways; ship and itinerary design in European river cruising

Rudi Schreiner is an Austrian-born river cruise executive and co-founder of AmaWaterways. He has received multiple industry honors including the Cruise Lines International Association (CLIA) Hall of Fame Lifetime Achievement Award (2016), the Travel Weekly Lifetime Achievement Award (2019), and the Seatrade Cruise Awards Outstanding Contribution Award (2019). Before co-founding AmaWaterways in 2002, Schreiner held senior roles at Uniworld and Viking River Cruises.

== Career ==
Schreiner was born in Vienna. He worked at Uniworld during the 1990s, serving as Vice President of Product Development during the company's early river cruise expansion. In March 2000, he left Uniworld to open Viking River Cruises' U.S. headquarters, serving as president of the line's U.S. operation.

In 2002, Schreiner co-founded AmaWaterways with Kristin Karst. He served as president and CEO while shaping the company's ship design and itinerary development as it expanded across European rivers. In 2025, he transitioned from day-to-day leadership to become chairman of the board while remaining involved in strategy and product development.

== Awards and recognition ==
Schreiner has received several industry honors recognizing his contributions to river cruising:

- In 2016, he was inducted into the Cruise Lines International Association (CLIA) Hall of Fame with a Lifetime Achievement Award.
- In 2019, he received the Travel Weekly Lifetime Achievement Award.
- In 2019, he received the Seatrade Cruise Awards Outstanding Contribution Award.
- In 2019, he was named (with co-founder Kristin Karst) to AFAR Media's Travel Vanguard list, recognizing twelve global travel industry visionaries.

Schreiner has been profiled in business publications including Bloomberg and the Los Angeles Business Journal's Valley 200 list of notable executives.
