= List of ferry operators =

The following is a list of ferry operators.

== Africa ==
- Algerie Ferries/ENTMV (Algeria – Spain, France)
- Comarit (Morocco – Spain, France, Italy)
- Comanav (Morocco – Spain, France)
- Cotunav (Tunisia – France)
- El Salam Maritime (Egypt – Saudi Arabia)
- FRS Iberia & Maroc (Spain)
- Kariba Ferries (Zimbabwe)
- Kenya Ferry Services (Kenya)

== Asia ==
- Archipelago Philippine Ferries Corporation (Visayas, Mindanao, Luzon, Batangas, Philippines)
- ASDP Indonesia Ferry (Indonesia)
- Montenegro Shipping Lines (Visayas, Mindanao, Luzon, Philippines)
- Weesam Express (Visayas, Mindanao, Philippines)
- Cokaliong Shipping Lines (Visayas, Mindanao, Philippines)
- Trans-Asia Shipping Lines (Visayas, Mindanao, Philippines)
- Aleson Shipping Lines (Visayas, Mindanao, Philippines, Sandakan)
- 2GO Travel (Luzon, Visayas, Mindanao, Philippines)
- Cruise Ferries
- Penang Ferry Service (George Town, Penang, Malaysia)
- SSTH Ocean Arrow
- Star Ferry (Victoria Harbour, Hong Kong)
- Shanzui Ferry (Chuanshan Archipelago, Jiangmen, Guangdong)

== Europe ==
=== A-M ===
- Aegean Speed Lines (Greece)
- Ålandstrafiken (mainland Finland to Åland)
- Algérie Ferries (Algeria to Spain and France)
- Amey plc (Windermere Ferry)
- ANEK Lines (Italy to Greece)
- Argyll and Bute Council (Firth of Lorne and Loch Linnhe)
- Autofähre Beckenried–Gersau (Lake Lucerne, Switzerland)
- Azerbaijan Caspian Shipping Company (Caspian Sea)
- Baleària (mainland Spain to Balearics, Morocco and Canary Islands in association with Fred. Olsen express)
- Blue Star Ferries (Greece, Aegean Islands)
- BornholmerFærgen (to Denmark, Germany and Sweden)
- Bristol Ferry Boats (in Bristol Harbour)
- Brittany Ferries (Bay of Biscay, Celtic Sea, English Channel, Irish Sea)
- Brownsea Island Ferries (Poole Harbour)
- Caledonian MacBrayne (Scotland)
- Caremar (Italy)
- Color Line (Norway to Denmark, Germany and Sweden)
- Corsica Ferries-Sardinia Ferries (Italy and France to Corsica and Sardinia)
- Destination Gotland (Swedish mainland to Gotland)
- DFDS Seaways (Baltic Sea, English Channel, Irish Sea, Mediterranean Sea, North Sea, Strait of Gibraltar)
- Eckerö Line (Baltic Sea)
- Eimskip Vestmannaeyjar, Iceland
- Finnlines (Northern Europe)
- Fjord Line (Denmark to Norway)
- Fjord1 Nordvestlandske (Norway)
- Fosen Trafikklag (Norway)
- Förde Reederei Seetouristik (Germany)
- FRS Baltic (Germany - Sweden)
- FRS Elbfähre (Germany)
- FRS Helgoline (Germany)
- FRS Iberia & Maroc (Spain)
- FRS Syltfähre (Germany)
- Fred. Olsen Express (Canary Islands including Huelva)
- Gosport Ferry Company (Gosport to Portsmouth)
- Grandi Navi Veloci (Italy - Med)
- Grimaldi Lines (Italy - Med)
- Hellenic Seaways (Greece)
- Highland Regional Council (Corran Ferry – Loch Linnhe)
- Hurtigruten (Norway domestic)
- İdo (Turkey domestic)
- Levante Ferries (Greece)
- Irish Ferries (Irish Sea, Celtic Sea)
- Isle of Man Steam Packet Company (Isle of Man, Irish Sea)
- Isle of Wight Council (Cowes Floating Bridge)
- Isles of Scilly Steamship Company (English mainland to Isles of Scilly)
- Jadrolinija (Croatia domestic, Croatia to Italy)
- Kihnu Veeteed (Estonia)
- King Harry Steam Ferry Company Ltd (River Fal)
- Lake Koman Ferry (Northern Albania)
- Maregiglio (Italy)
- Merseytravel (Mersey Ferry)
- Minoan Lines (Italy to Greece)
- Moby Lines (Italy and the Mediterranean)
- Molslinjen (Denmark)

=== N-Z ===
- Namsos Trafikkselskap (Norway)
- Naviera Armas -Armas Trasmediterránea group (Mainland Canary Islands including Huelva to Canary Islands, Spain to Morocco)
- NorthLink Ferries (Orkney and Shetland, Scotland)
- Øresundslinjen (Sweden - Denmark)
- Orkney Ferries (Orkney, Scotland)
- P&O Ferries (United Kingdom to France; Netherlands, Belgium and Spain)
- P&O Irish Sea (Irish Sea)
- Pentland Ferries (Orkney, Scotland)
- Polferries (the Baltic Sea)
- Red Funnel (Isle of Wight to mainland England.)
- Royal Borough of Greenwich (Woolwich Ferry across the River Thames)
- Saremar (Italy)
- Scandlines (Baltic Sea)
- Shetland Islands Council (internal Shetland islands)
- Silja Line (Finland to Sweden)
- Siremar (Italy)
- Smyril Line (North Sea and the North Atlantic)
- SNAV (Italy and the Mediterranean)
- Stena Line (North Sea, Irish Sea, Baltic Sea)
- Strandfaraskip Landsins (within the Faroe Islands)
- Superfast Ferries (Athens; Adriatic)
- Tallink (the Baltic Sea)
- TESO (Den Helder to Texel, Netherlands)
- Thames Clippers (services on the River Thames including Canary Wharf - Rotherhithe Ferry)
- Tirrenia di Navigazione (Italy)
- Transtejo & Soflusa (Lisbon, Portugal)
- Trasmediterránea -Naviera Armas Trasmediterránea group (mainland Spain to Balearics, Canary Islands, Algeria and Morocco)
- Toremar (Italy)
- Torghatten Trafikkselskap (Norway)
- TS Laevad (Estonia)
- TT-Line (Germany and Poland to Sweden)
- Unity Line (Świnoujście to Ystad and Świnoujście to Trelleborg)
- Venezia Lines (Italy to Croatia and Slovenia)
- Ventouris Ferries (Italy to Greece)
- Viking Line (the Baltic Sea)
- Wasaline (Finland to Sweden)
- Waxholmsbolaget (Stockholm, Sweden)
- Western Ferries (Clyde) Ltd (Firth of Clyde)
- Weiße Flotte (Stralsund) (Germany)
- Wightlink (Isle of Wight to mainland England)
- Zürichsee-Fähre Horgen-Meilen (Lake Zurich, Switzerland)

== North America ==
- Alaska Marine Highway System (ports across Alaska as well as Prince Rupert, British Columbia and Bellingham, Washington)
- Anderson Ferry (Cincinnati, Ohio) (goes across the Ohio River to allow Ohio residents quick access to Kentucky and vice versa)
- Arctic Umiaq Line (coastal ferry along the western coast of Greenland)
- Arkansas Highway and Transportation Department (operates one ferry across Bull Shoals Lake)
- Augusta Ferry (service between Higginsport, Ohio, and Augusta, Kentucky)
- Baja Ferries (Mexico)
- Bay Ferries (eastern Canada and US, Caribbean Sea)
- BC Ferries (British Columbia, Canada)
- BillyBey Ferry Company (Weehawken, New Jersey)
- Black Ball Transport (Olympic Peninsula to Vancouver Island)
- Block Island Express (New London, Connecticut, to Block Island, Rhode Island)
- Blue and Gold Fleet (connects San Francisco with Sausalito, Tiburon, Angel Island, Oakland, Alameda, and Vallejo) (San Francisco, California)
- Bridgeport & Port Jefferson Ferry (Bridgeport, Connecticut, to Port Jefferson, New York)
- California Department of Transportation operates the Howard Landing Ferry on the California Delta
- Clackamas County, Oregon (Canby Ferry) Cable pulled ferry across the Willamette River in the vicinity of Canby, Oregon
- Cape May–Lewes Ferry (service between Cape May County, New Jersey, and Lewes, Delaware, across the Delaware Bay)
- Casco Bay Lines (service between Portland, Maine, and the Islands of Casco Bay)
- Cave-In-Rock Ferry (service between Cave-In-Rock, Illinois, and rural Crittenden County, Kentucky)
- Chester-Hadlyme ferry (seasonal ferry operating on the Connecticut River)
- Cross Sound Ferry (New London, Connecticut, to Orient, New York)
- Delaware State Parks runs ferry services to Pea Patch Island State Park from Delaware City, Delaware, and Fort Mott (New Jersey)
- Diskoline (domestic passenger-only ferries in the Disko Bay area in Greenland; summer services only due to sea ice in winter)
- Fire Island Ferries (service between Bay Shore, New York, and Fire Island, New York, across the Great South Bay)
- Fraser River Marine Transportation Ltd. (British Columbia, Canada)
- Golden Gate Transit (ferries in the San Francisco Bay Area)
- Governors Island Alliance (New York City)
- Harris County, Texas (operates a ferry across Buffalo Bayou near the San Jacinto Monument)
- Hatton Ferry (James River, Virginia)
- Hornblower Cruises (San Francisco)
- Inter-Island Ferry Authority (five Southeast Alaskan communities)
- Jacksonville Water Taxi (Jacksonville, Florida)
- Jet Express (U.S. Lake Erie Islands)
- Lake Champlain Transportation Company (on Lake Champlain in the United States)
- Lake Express (on Lake Michigan)
- Lake Michigan Carferry (operates the SS Badger)
- Liberty Water Taxi (Jersey City, New Jersey)
- Louisiana Department of Transportation and Development (LDOTD)
- Mackinac Island Ferry Company (formerly Star Line) (access to Mackinac Island, Michigan from St. Ignace and Mackinaw City)
- Marine Atlantic (Atlantic Canada)
- MBTA ferry (Boston)
- Metro Transit (public transit routes in Halifax, Nova Scotia)
- Millersburg Ferry (Susquehanna River, Pennsylvania, between Millerburg and Liverpool, Pennsylvania)
- NYC Ferry (New York City)
- New York Water Taxi (New York City)
- North Carolina Ferry System (operates eight ferry routes)
- Northumberland Ferries (eastern Canada)
- NY Waterway (Weehawken, New Jersey)
- Owen Sound Transportation Company, Tobermory, Ontario
- Oxford–Bellevue Ferry (Talbot County, Maryland)
- Plaquemines Parish, Louisiana
- RiverLink Ferry (between Philadelphia and Camden, New Jersey across the Delaware River)
- Rocky Hill-Glastonbury ferry (seasonal ferry operating on the Connecticut River)
- Savannah Belles Ferry (Savannah, Georgia)
- Shepler's Ferry (access to Mackinac Island, Michigan from St. Ignace and Mackinaw City)
- Sistersville Ferry (crosses the Ohio River between Sistersville, West Virginia and the unincorporated community of Fly, Ohio)
- Société des traversiers du Québec (Quebec, Canada)
- Staten Island Ferry (New York City)
- The Steamship Authority (Nantucket Sound, Massachusetts)
- Texas Department of Transportation (operates two ferries, one at Galveston, Texas, and the other at Port Aransas, Texas)
- Toronto Parks, Forestry and Recreation Division (operate three Toronto Island ferries)
- Toronto Port Authority (operate one island airport ferry)
- Utah Department of Transportation/UDOT operates the Charles Hall Ferry across Lake Powell connecting UT 276 inside Glen Canyon National Recreation Area.
- Valley View Ferry (connects Jessamine County and Lexington, Kentucky, with Madison County via SR 169 at the Kentucky River)
- VDOT provides free car ferry services in Southern Virginia, including the Jamestown Ferry
- Wahkiakum County Ferry, across the Columbia River between Oregon and Washington
- Washington State Ferries (northwest US)
- White's Ferry, a cable ferry between Maryland and Virginia
- Woodland Ferry, cable ferry located in western Sussex County, Delaware, spanning the Nanticoke River at Woodland, Delaware, west of the city of Seaford

In addition, a private operator runs a ferry across the Current River in Missouri, at Akers Ferry crossing in the Ozark National Scenic Riverways.

== Oceania ==
- Australian National Line
- Bluebridge (connects North Island and South Island in New Zealand)
- Captain Cook Cruises, Australia
- Captain Cook Cruises Western Australia
- Central Coast Ferries
- Church Point Ferry
- Cronulla & National Park Ferry Cruises
- Fullers360 (Waitemata Harbour and inner Hauraki Gulf ferry service)
- Hobart Historic Cruises (River Derwent)
- Kangaroo Island SeaLink (mainland South Australia to Kangaroo Island)
- Kelsian Group (Great Barrier Island ferry service)
- KiwiRail
- Matilda Cruises
- Manly Fast Ferry
- Mona (River Derwent)
- Newcastle Transport
- Peninsula Searoad Transport (crossing Port Phillip)
- Pennicott Wilderness Journeys (River Derwent, Bruny Island, Port Arthur-Eaglehawk Neck)
- Peppermint Bay Cruises (River Derwent)
- Port Arthur Historic Site
- RiverCity Ferries
- Searoad Ferries (Ro/Ro ferries across Bass Strait)
- Spirit of Tasmania (Ro/Pax ferries connecting Tasmania to Victoria)
- Strait Link
- Sydney Ferries (Sydney, Australia)
- Tasmanian Steam Navigation Company
- Transdev Sydney Ferries
- Transport for NSW (various inland crossings)

== South America ==
- Conferry (connects Isla Margarita to mainland Venezuela)
- Ferries that connect Colonia, Uruguay and Montevideo, Uruguay to Buenos Aires, Argentina:
  - Buquebus
  - Colonia Express
- Navimag (Chile)
- Transbordadora Austral Broom S.A. (Chile)

== See also ==
- List of cruise lines
- List of largest cruise lines
