= Catherine Powell =

British businesswoman (born 1967)

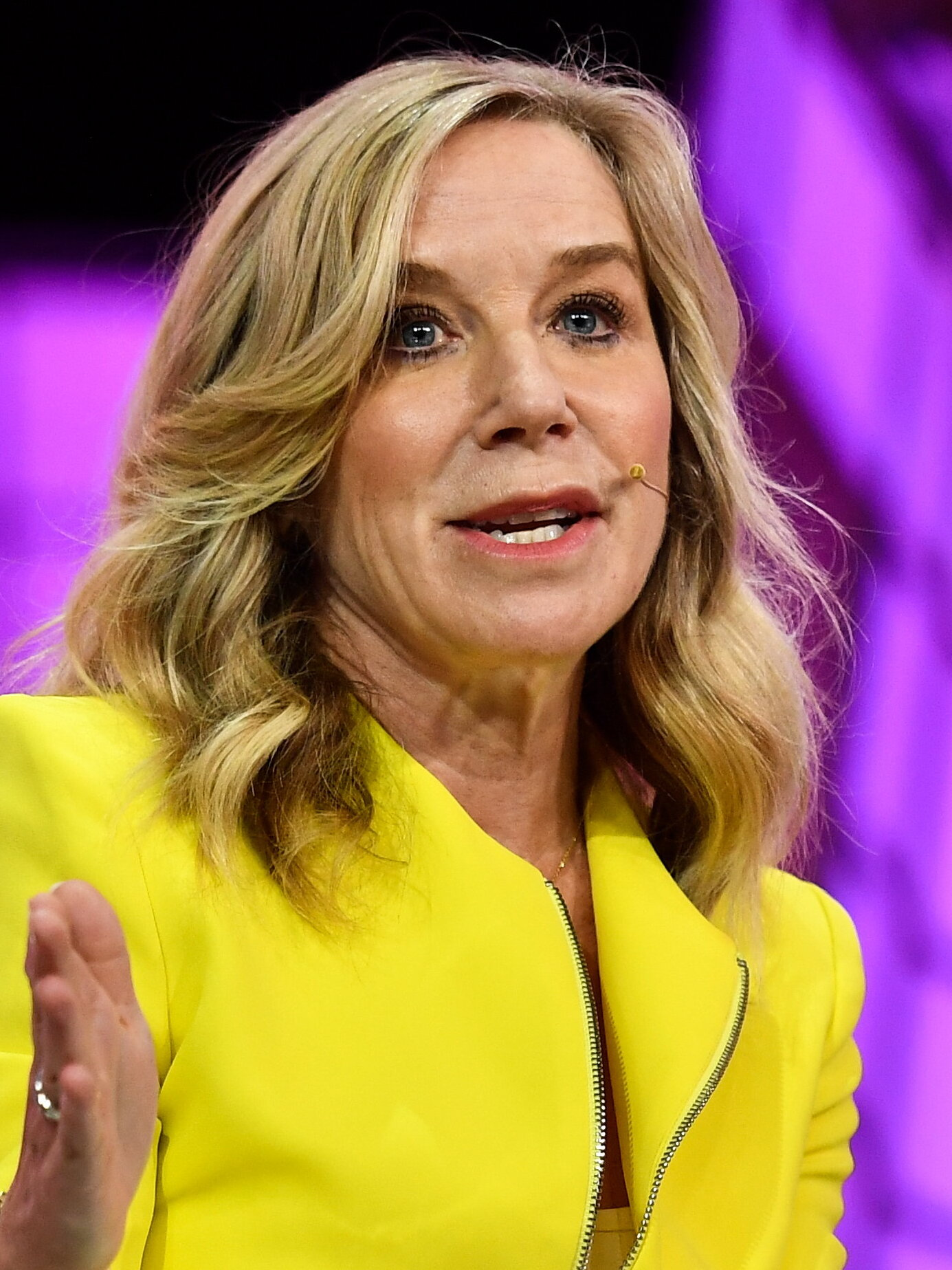
- Powell in 2022
- Born: 2 December 1967 (age 58)
- Education: Somerville College, Oxford
- Employer: AmaWaterways
- Title: President
- Spouse: Hugh Powell
- Children: 3

Catherine Powell (née Young; born 2 December 1967), is a British businesswoman. She was the global head of hosting at Airbnb, having formerly been the president of the Disney Parks, Western Region (where she oversaw Disneyland, Walt Disney World, and Disneyland Paris). She took over as the incoming President of AmaWaterways, effective February 17, 2025.

== Early life and education ==
Catherine Young (later Powell) was born on 2 December 1967 in England. She moved with her family to live in Hong Kong at the age of eight, but later attended boarding school in England (Downe House).

She studied Philosophy, Politics and Economics at Somerville College, Oxford.

With the benefit of some previous professional experience in television, Powell joined BBC Worldwide in 1997.

== Career at Disney ==
Powell joined The Walt Disney Company in 2004 as creative director, Group Portfolio. She then became executive director of sales at Disney Media Distribution in the United Kingdom and Ireland, and then vice president of the same department, at which point her scope broadened to include Scandinavia, the Benelux, and Israel. Several years later, Powell led the media distribution department for The Walt Disney Company in Europe, the Middle East, and Africa. She oversaw the conception and implementation of marketing strategies for group's television channels, such as Disney Channel, Disney XD, Disney Junior, and ABC News.

In June 2014, Powell left Europe to become managing director of the Walt Disney Company in Australia and New Zealand. Based in the Sydney office, she was responsible for the implementation of the company's strategy, the coordination and management of all departments, supervising international franchise opportunities, the development of existing subsidiaries, and exploring new development possibilities in the region.

In April 2016, Catherine Powell was appointed president of the Euro Disney group, succeeding Tom Wolber in that role with effect from July 2016.

Powell was named president, Disney Parks, Western Region in March 2018, with responsibility for Walt Disney World, Disneyland Resort, and Disneyland Paris.

It was announced on 23 September 2019 that Powell's position was eliminated and that she would be leaving Disney after 15 years with the company "to do something different."

== Career at Airbnb ==
In January 2020 it was announced that Powell had been appointed head of Airbnb Experiences (which offers activities, such as tours and events, through the Airbnb platform) Seven months later, she was promoted to become Airbnb's Global Head of Hosting.

Powell left her position as global head of hosting in June 2024.

== Personal life ==
Powell married her husband, Hugh Powell, in 1993, and changed her surname from Young to Powell. They have three sons. Due to the family's frequent moves due to her husband's job, their eldest son was born in Paris, the second in the UK, and the third in Germany.

== Other activities ==
Powell has been a member of the Sydney Opera House Trust since January 2016, and is an elected member of Chief Executive Women in Australia.
