= Cruise Lines International Association =

Trade association

Cruise Lines International Association (CLIA) is a cruise line trade association. It merged with International Council of Cruise Lines (ICCL) in 2006, forming an expanded organization incorporating the existing functions of both organizations. The merged organization, which uses the CLIA name, is located in Washington, D.C.

Established in 1975, Cruise Lines International Association (CLIA) is the world's largest cruise industry trade association based on the number of passenger cruise ships operated by its members. However, there is a significant proportion of the wider cruise industry which does not subscribe to CLIA's member body and which transports a considerable volume of passengers. There is no regulatory requirement for cruise operators to subscribe to the trade body, each year a significant number of cruise passengers are transported on a growing number of non-member vessels. The trade body has no representation across the entirety of Africa, for example.

CLIA works with the Global Sustainable Tourism Council (GSTC) to help port cities analyze how to manage tourism flows and map out a road map for a sustainable future. To date, the industry has partnered with the City of Dubrovnik, Corfu and Heraklion to collaborate and identify best practices for long-term destination management to the benefit of residents and visitors alike. While it is unclear what level of support is delivered, CLIA is also a corporate sponsor of the Mercy Ship program.

The trade body's marketing and education activities may be considered activities more closely related to influence or lobbying, however the organization holds no powers to set or enforce laws or regulations.

In response to the COVID-19 pandemic, CLIA voluntarily suspended sailings out of US ports on 13 March 2020, one day before the Centers for Disease Control and Prevention issued a no-sail order. However, COVID-19 outbreaks continued on ships already at sea. Whilst CLIA had drafted a plan to hire a global rescue team to extract infected passengers, by 6 April this had not been realized and public health authorities had to intervene to evacuate critically ill people from ships.

== Membership ==
CLIA has several categories of membership:

- 50+ Cruise Line Members – From ocean to specialty cruise ships, CLIA member lines represent more than 95 percent of global cruise capacity.
- 350+ Executive Partner Members – Key suppliers and partners to the cruise lines.
- 13,000+ Global Travel Agency and 50,000+ Travel Agent Members.
- CLIA Cruise Line Members serve more than 30 million passengers annually.

== Member lines ==
As of July 2020, CLIA Cruise Line Members are made up of the following lines:

=== Global cruise line members ===
- AIDA Cruises
- AmaWaterways
- American Cruise Lines
- Avalon Waterways
- Azamara Cruises
- Carnival Cruise Line
- Celebrity Cruises
- Celestyal Cruises
- Costa Cruises
- Crystal Cruises
- Cunard Line
- Disney Cruise Line
- Emerald Waterways
- Holland America Line
- MSC Cruises
- Mystic Cruises
- Norwegian Cruise Line
- Oceania Cruises
- Pearl Seas Cruises
- PONANT Yacht Cruises and Expeditions
- Princess Cruises
- Regent Seven Seas Cruises
- Riviera Travel River Cruises
- Royal Caribbean International
- Scenic Luxury Cruises & Tours
- Seabourn
- SeaDream Yacht Club
- Silversea Cruises
- TUI Cruises
- Uniworld Boutique River Cruise Collection
- Virgin Voyages
- Windstar Cruises

=== European regional cruise line members ===
- A-Rosa Cruises
- Belmond Cruises
- CroisiEurope
- Hapag Lloyd Cruises
- Lüftner Cruises
- Marella Cruises
- P&O Cruises UK
- Pullmantur
- Riviera Travel
- Saga
- Shearings Holiday

=== Australasia regional cruise line members ===
- APT Group
- Aqua Expeditions
- Coral Expeditions
- Dream Cruises
- Ganges Voyager
- P&O Cruises Australia
- Riviera Travel
- Star Cruises
- Travelmarvel
