= The Travel Corporation =

US based hotel and tour operator

- Type: Privately held company
- Industry: Travel and leisure
- Founded: August 1920; 106 years ago
- Founder: Stanley S. Tollman
- Headquarters: London, UK, United Kingdom
- Number of locations: Sydney, Australia; London, UK; Toronto, Canada; Los Angeles, USA; Johannesburg, South Africa; Singapore, Asia; Auckland, New Zealand; Geneva, Switzerland
- Key people: Carl Leaver, Chairman; Simon Jones, Chief executive officer; Melissa Da Silva, Deputy CEO
- Services: Tour operator
- Owner: Funds managed by Apollo Global Management
- Number of employees: 3,000
- Website: ttc.com

The Travel Corporation is a tour operator based in Cypress, California, and Bermuda with operations in Australia, New Zealand, Europe, South Africa, and Asia. It operates tours under the brand names Trafalgar Tours, Insight Vacations, Contiki Tours, Uniworld, Costsaver, Luxury Gold, HAGGiS Adventures, Highland Explorer, Brendan Vacations, AAT Kings, Inspiring Journeys, African Travel, Aussie Adventure, Lion World Travel, Adventure World Travel, Evan Evans, Grand European Travel (GET), Down Under Tours, Tracoin, Destination America, Travel Corporation Asia, and SEIT Outback Australia.

== History ==
The company was founded in Cape Town, South Africa, in 1920 by Stanley S. Tollman. The company set up TreadRight Foundation, a not-for-profit organization in 2008.

In October 2024, the company was acquired by funds managed by Apollo Global Management.

In 2024, the company generated EBITDA of $190 million.
