= Uniworld =

Cruise line

Uniworld Boutique River Cruise Collection
- Type: Private
- Industry: Cruise line
- Founded: Los Angeles, California, 1976
- Headquarters: Los Angeles, California, California, United States
- Area served: Worldwide
- Key people: Ellen Bettridge, President & CEO
- Products: River cruises
- Number of employees: 115
- Parent: The Travel Corporation
- Website: www.uniworld.com

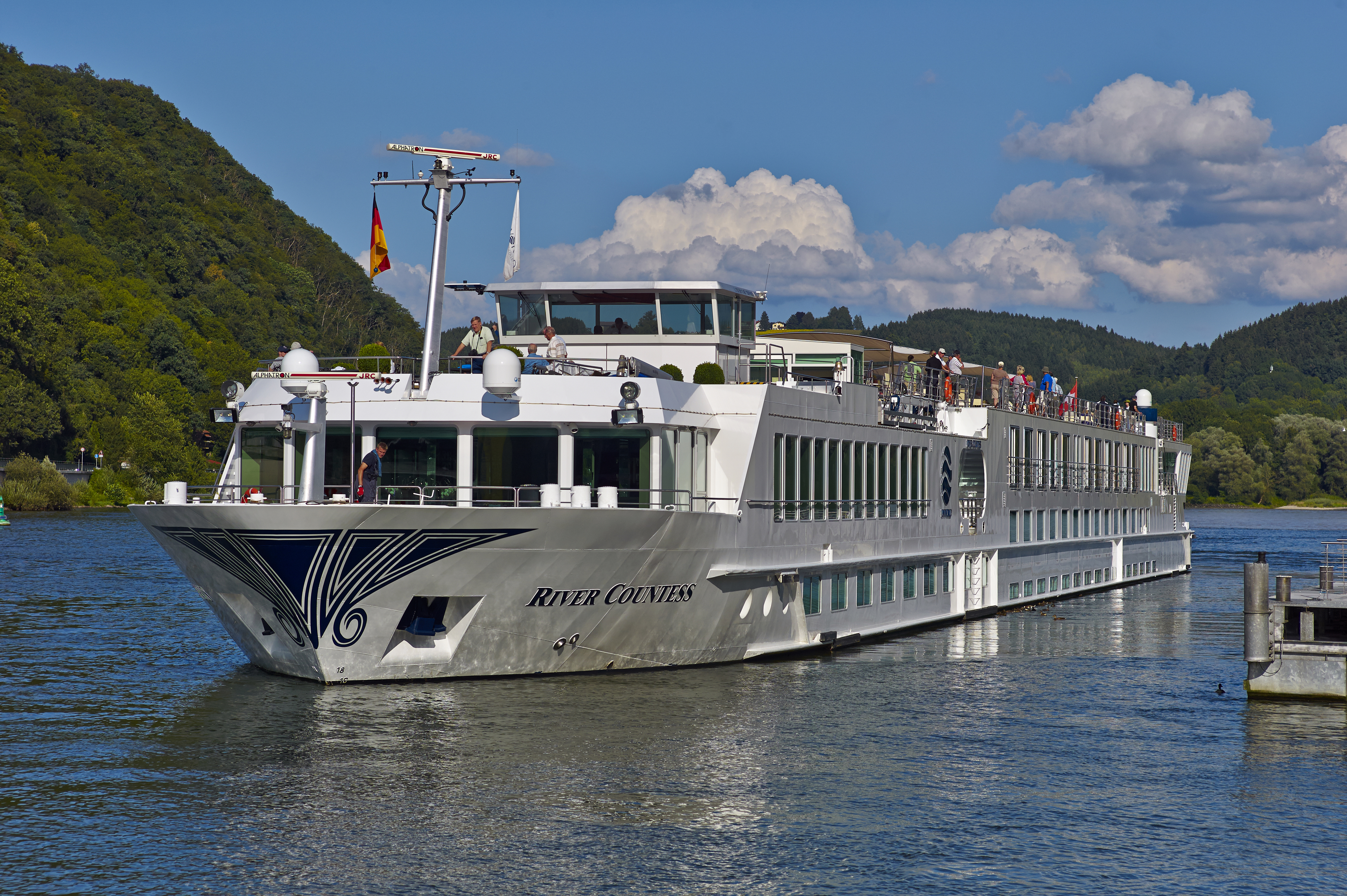
River Countess ship at Passau

Uniworld Boutique River Cruises is a luxury river cruise line headquartered in Los Angeles, California with operational offices in the Netherlands, Switzerland, France, and China that operates river cruises in Europe, Egypt, India, Peru, and Southeast Asia. The company is owned by The Travel Corporation, which is owned by funds managed by Apollo Global Management. It operates more than 500 river cruises annually, with itineraries in over 20 countries. Its cruises range in length from 8–55 days, with an extensive list of options for pre- and post-cruise extensions by hotel, land tour, or luxury rail.

Travelers booking at the base fare on any of Uniworld’s river cruises in Europe will have three daily meals, unlimited alcoholic and non-alcoholic beverages, shore excursions, onboard entertainment, fitness classes and facilities, snacks, 24-hour room service, and more included. Suite guests also have access to the services of a personal butler. Amenities vary on the brand’s chartered vessels in India, Southeast Asia, Egypt, and Peru. Upgrade options for excursions, spa treatments, celebration packages, and a "Diamond Menu" of non-included wines and spirits are also available at an additional cost.

Uniworld offers cruises with itineraries and/or activities designed around a theme. Options include "Jewish Heritage Cruises" with excursions focusing on Jewish culture in Central European destinations, "Holiday Season Cruises", a family-friendly "Generations Collection", cycling-heavy itineraries designed for active travelers in partnership with Butterfield & Robinson, and more.

== History ==
Uniworld was founded in Los Angeles in 1976 by Yugoslavian-born entrepreneur Serba Ilich, a former KLM executive who targeted the American market for European river travel.

During the early 1990s the company pivoted from escorted touring to dedicated river cruising in Europe, launching its first European river cruise program in 1993. At that time, product development was led by Rudi Schreiner, who helped shape Uniworld's early itineraries and capitalized on new infrastructure such as the Main-Danube Canal.

Schreiner departed Uniworld in 2000 to open Viking River Cruises' U.S. headquarters and serve as president of its U.S. operation.

In 2004, an affiliate of The Travel Corporation acquired Uniworld for an undisclosed sum, integrating the river cruise line into TTC's portfolio.

In 2021, Uniworld launched its Cruise & Rail program. In partnership with Golden Eagle Luxury Trains in Europe and The Maharajas’ Express in India, these itineraries pair river cruises with multi-night journeys by private train.

In 2023, Uniworld launched the first true "world cruise" on the rivers. The travel style, which takes passengers to a long list of destinations over what is often the course of multiple months, is typically only available on large ocean cruises. Uniworld’s version combines several river cruises—with included flights between legs of the trip—to create the farthest-reaching itinerary in modern river cruising. The 2023 Rivers of the World cruise spanned from Cairo, Egypt to Lisbon, Portugal over 47 days, and the 2024 Rivers of the World cruise will travel from Lima, Peru to Ho Chi Minh City, Vietnam over 55 days.

=== Ships ===
For the majority of its European cruises, Uniworld directly owns and operates its ships, which are known for their highly individual, boutique design.

The rest of its fleet—the S.S. São Gabriel in Portugal, the S.S. Sphinx and River Tosca in Egypt, the Ganges Voyager II in India, the Aria Amazon in Peru, the Mekong Jewel in Vietnam and Cambodia, and the S.S. Victoria and S.S. Elisabeth in Central Europe—are chartered in partnership with affiliate travel groups.

== Fleet ==
Ship name	Year built	Remodeled	Length	Guests	Staterooms
River Duchess	2003	2012	361 feet (110 m)	130	65
River Princess	2001	2011	361 feet (110 m)	130	65
River Queen	1999	2010	361 feet (110 m)	128	64
S.S. Antoinette	2011		443 feet (135 m)	152	76
S.S. Beatrice	2009	2018	430 feet (130 m)	148	74
S.S. Bon Voyage	2006	2019	361 feet (110 m)	124	62
S.S. Catherine	2014		443 feet (135 m)	158	79
S.S. Joie De Vivre	2016		410 feet	128	64
S.S. La Venezia	2002	2020	361 feet (110 m)	126	63
S.S. Maria Theresa	2015		443 feet (135 m)	150	57
S.S. São Gabriel	2020		262 feet	100	50
S.S. Victoria	2017			110	55
S.S. Elisabeth	2017			110	55
River Tosca	2009		236 feet (72 m)	82	41
S.S. Sphnix	2020		236 feet (72 m)	84	42
Mekong Jewel	2020		262 feet (80 m)	68	34
Ganges Voyager II	2016		185 feet (56 m)	56	28
Aria Amazon	2010	2019	147 feet (45 m)	32	16

Uniworld is a member of Cruise Lines International Association.

== Awards ==
In 2023, Uniworld was named the “Best River Cruise Line” in the Virtuoso Awards, “Best River Cruise Line” in the Telegraph Awards, “Best River Cruise Company” in the Globe Travel Awards, and “River Cruise Line of the Year” by the Irish Travel Industry.

In 2022, Uniworld was named "Best River Cruise Line" in Global Traveler’s Leisure Lifestyle Awards for the 5th year running, "Best Luxury River Cruise Line" in the Wave Awards, "Best River Cruise Company" in the Irish Travel Trade Awards, "Best River Cruise Line" in Travel Weekly’s Asia Reader’s Choice Awards, and "Best Luxury River Cruise" in the Tripzilla Excellence Awards, Uniworld also won the #3 spot in Travel + Leisure’s 2022 World's Best Awards in the River Cruise category.

In 2019, Travel + Leisure named Uniworld the "World’s Best River Cruise Line” and Travel Daily awarded Uniworld for the “Best sustainable travel or tourism initiative" in river cruising.

In 2018, Travel + Leisure named Uniworld the "World’s Best River Cruise Line." Uniworld was also awarded in multiple categories of the Cruise Critic Editors’ Picks, including "Best River Cruise Line," "Best River Ship Refurbishment" for the S.S. Beatrice, and "Top European River Cruise Line."

In 2017, Uniworld’s S.S. Joie de Vivre was named the “Best New River Ship” by the Cruise Critic Editors’ Picks, which also awarded the line "Best Service." Cruise Critic Australia awarded Uniworld for the "Best River Cruise Line" and Cruise Critic UK awarded the brand "Best River Cruise Line," "Best for Luxury", and "Best Service".
