= Contiki Tours =

Tour company

Contiki
- Type: Subsidiary
- Industry: Travel; Tourism
- Founded: 1962; 64 years ago in New Zealand
- Founder: John Anderson
- Headquarters: Geneva, Switzerland
- Area served: Worldwide
- Services: Tour operator
- Parent: The Travel Corporation
- Website: contiki.com/en-au/

Contiki is a tour operator that caters to people between the ages of 18 and 35, offering over 350 tours in over 75 countries in Europe, Australia, New Zealand, North America, South America, Africa, the Middle East, and Asia. It is a subsidiary of The Travel Corporation, which is owned by funds managed by Apollo Global Management. Its tours historically had a reputation for partying; however, it also operates cultural trips that focus less on alcohol, which are more popular with Generation Z.

The company owns lodging facilities in Europe, including the Chateau De Cruix, a 16th-century castle in the Beaujolais wine region, and the Gasthof Schoneck in the Austrian Tyrol.

The name "Contiki" comes from the portmanteau 'Con' from the word 'Continent' and 'Tiki'; from the Māori referring to the first man, often symbolised as a pendant known as hei-tiki. It can also be attributed to the New Zealand slang 'Tiki-tour' describing taking a longer route to a destination in order to explore.

== History ==
In 1962, when New Zealander John Anderson was alone and without much money he devised a plan so that he would not have to travel alone and could see Europe for free. He put a deposit on a minibus, gathered a group of people to travel with, and spent 12 weeks exploring Europe with his group. At the end of the trip, he unsuccessfully tried to sell the minibus. As a result, he decided to promote his Europe trip again, and this time he was able to fit two trips into the summer season. The first tours were booked by 19- to 29-year-olds, starting the tradition of Contiki Holidays being for youth travelers.

Contiki Travel Ltd was established in the UK in 1966. By the end of the 1960s, Contiki expanded from European tours and was running ski programs, along with trips in India and the Middle East. In the mid-1980s it was acquired by The Travel Corporation.

Contiki launched its first ever safari trip in Sub-Saharan Africa in 2018.

In 2023, Contiki launched its first trip to South Korea.

In 2024, Contiki launched its first trip to the Philippines.

=== Incidents ===
In September 2011, a 23-year old Australian woman was found dead on a tour in Italy after falling ill.

In December 2016, one of the company's vans went off a cliff on the way to a surf beach in the Gili Islands, killing one passenger and injuring two others.
