= Sail Croatia =

United Kingdom-based cruise line operating in Croatia

- Company type: Privately held company
- Industry: Tourism, Hospitality, Travel
- Founded: 2005
- Founders: Grant Seuren; Helle Seuren
- Headquarters: Egham, United Kingdom
- Area served: Adriatic Sea
- Website: www.sail-croatia.com

Sail Croatia is a cruise line operating in the Adriatic Sea, along the Dalmatian coast of Croatia. It promotes an ecological initiative called Green Sail.

== History ==
Sail Croatia was founded in the UK by Grant and Helle Seuren in 2005. Grant was born in New Zealand, and Helle is Danish.

== Cruising vessels and yachts ==
In 2013, the line had four chartered motorized cruising vessels. Along with sailing, the offer included kayaking and rafting on the mainland and buggy safaris on the islands. Its "Cycle Croatia" cruises are trips where tourists sail the Adriatic, and cycle a total of 189 km in seven days or less. The motor yachts, which take up to 40 passengers, are based in Split Marina.

Sail Croatia operates small ship cruises called "Elegance" cruises, onboard its luxury vessels including Olimp (2017), which carries up to 38 passengers and departs from Split or Dubrovnik. Other cruising options include sightseeing cruises called "Explorer" cruises, party cruises called "Navigator" cruises, hiking cruises called "Hike Croatia" and cycling cruises called "Cycle Croatia". All cruises have seven-day itineraries and typically run between April and October every year.

In 2024, Sail Croatia increased the size of its "Elegance" fleet to five, with the addition of MS Romantic Star (2016) and MS Katarina (2016). It introduced wine cruises, yoga-themed wellness cruises, and a historical heritage cruise to Croatia's World Heritage Sites. It launched a hiking cruise to Croatia's national parks and luxury hike cruises onboard its Salve di Mare ship.

Sail Croatia also has a fleet of 20 luxury yachts and Lagoon catamarans for private skippered yacht tours, bareboat charters and flotilla holidays.

== Green Sail initiative and ecotourism ==
The Green Sail initiative began in 2014 to educate cruise lines, sailors, and tourists about the importance of sorting and recycling waste on the Adriatic, and on the problem of discharging black wastewater from various types of vessels in Croatia. It also provides recreational sailors with hand nets to use in waste removal from the sea. By mid-2017, it had managed to gather 500 charter lines and partner marinas.

Green Sail also organizes cleanup initiatives along the Dalmatian coastline, with volunteers removing up to nine cubic meters of waste from the sea in one clean up.

== See also ==
- List of cruise lines
