= Scenic (cruise line) =

Cruise line and tour company

Scenic Luxury Cruises and Tours
- Industry: Tourism
- Founded: 1986
- Services: River Cruising, Ocean Cruising, Escorted Tours
- Website: https://www.scenic.co.uk/

Scenic Luxury Cruises and Tours is a privately held Cruise Line and Touring Company, established by Australian businessman Glen Moroney in 1986. The company opened its first United Kingdom office in 2007, its headquarters in Manchester. Scenic's inaugural European river cruise occurred in 2008 with the debut of its first river ship, "Scenic Sapphire".

As of January 2024, Scenic operates 15 river cruise ships, providing services in Europe and Southeast Asia, and previously including Russia. On August 15, Scenic introduced its first purpose-built ocean cruise ship, Scenic Eclipse, which operates in the Americas, Europe, the Arctic, Antarctica, and the Norwegian fjords. In April 2023, Scenic launched Scenic Eclipse II, a nearly identical sister ship.

== History ==
Scenic was established by Glen Moroney in 1986. The company first offered river cruises in Europe in 2008 with the launch of Scenic Sapphire, followed by Scenic Emerald, Scenic Diamond, and Scenic Ruby in 2009.

In 2012, Scenic launched the Scenic Tsar, which operated on the Moscow-St Petersburg route. In 2013, Scenic established Emerald Waterways as a lower-cost river cruise line. In 2014, Scenic expanded its fleet with the addition of the 169-passenger Scenic Jade, operating on the River Danube, and the 126-passenger Scenic Gem, servicing the River Seine.

In 2016, Scenic launched several new ships: Scenic Azure for the River Douro in Portugal; Scenic Amber for Europe's major rivers, and Scenic Aura and Scenic Spirit for the Irrawaddy and Mekong rivers in Southeast Asia. In January 2016, Scenic announced plans to enter the ocean cruise market with the launch of Scenic Eclipse, a 228-passenger ocean liner, which began service in August 2019.

As of 2019, Scenic is redesigning 10 ships, including Scenic Diamond, Scenic Sapphire, Scenic Ruby, Scenic Pearl, Scenic Jasper, Scenic Opal, Scenic Amber, Scenic Crystal, Scenic Jade, and Scenic Jewel. In March 2022, Scenic suspended all Russian operations following the Russian invasion of Ukraine.

The Scenic Ikon will be an expedition and ultra-luxury cruise ship, or "Discovery Yacht," currently under construction for the Australian company Scenic Group. It is the third vessel in this class, following the Scenic Eclipse and Scenic Eclipse II, with the Scenic Ikon being an enlarged version. The ship is being built at MKM Yachts in Rijeka, Croatia, and is scheduled to enter service in April 2028. With a length of 205 meters and a gross tonnage of approximately 26,500 GT, the Scenic Ikon will accommodate 270 passengers in 135 suites.

== Cruises and destinations ==
Scenic operates on nine rivers, covering major rivers in Europe and Southeast Asia, and formerly the Volga in Russia.

With the introduction of their ocean cruise ships, Scenic also operates in Antarctica, the Arctic, the Americas, the Mediterranean, the Baltic, the British Isles, and the Norwegian Fjords.

== Current fleet ==
Expedition ship

Ship name	Year launched	Type	Length	Crew	Guests	Registry
Scenic Eclipse	2018	Ocean Vessel	166 m	200	228	Nassau, Bahamas
Scenic Eclipse II	2023	Ocean Vessel	166 m	200	228	Nassau, Bahamas
