= Scenic Eclipse =

Six-star discovery passenger ship

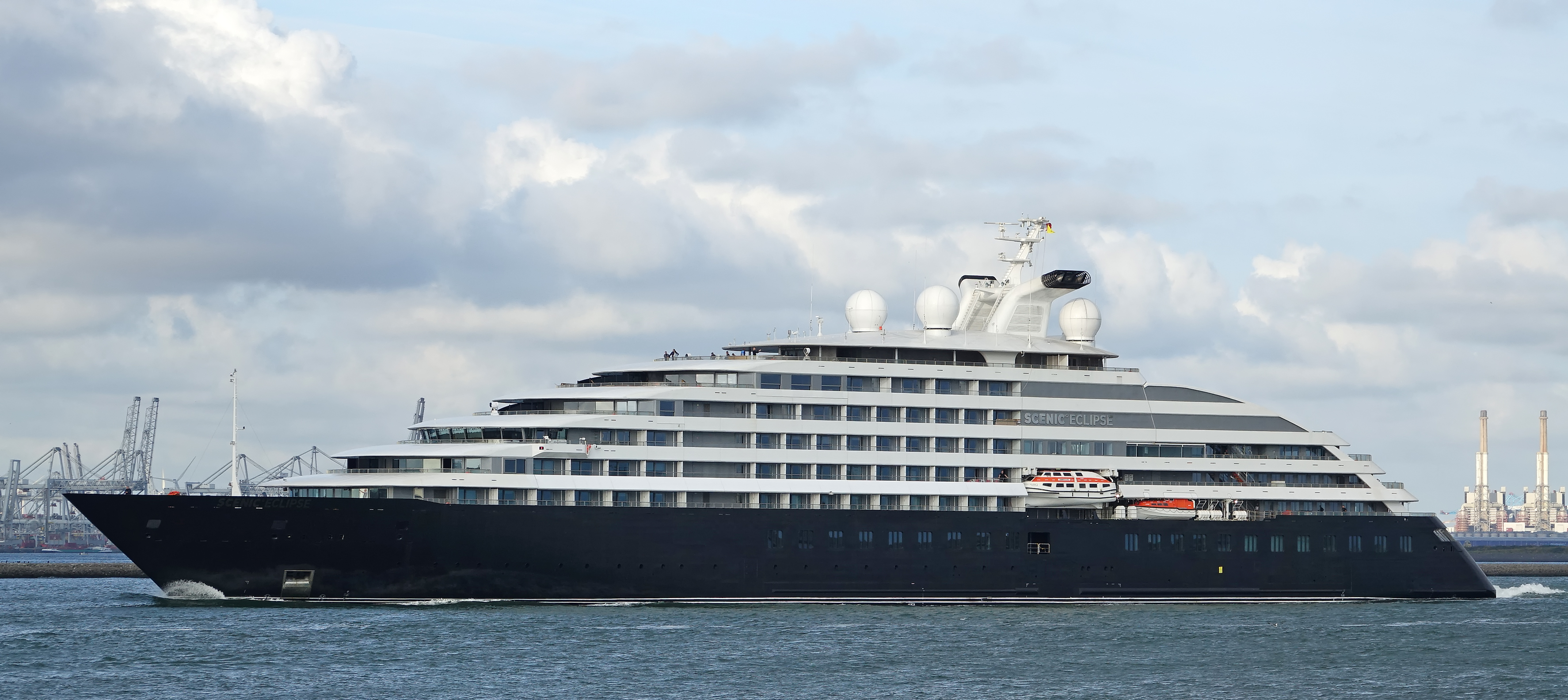
- Scenic Eclipse at Hook of Holland in August 2019

History
- Name: Scenic Eclipse
- Owner: Scenic Tours (Australia)
- Operator: Scenic
- Port of registry: Malta (2019–2020); (The Bahamas) Nassau, Bahamas (2020–present)
- Builder: Uljanik, Pula, Croatia
- Launched: January 31, 2018
- Christened: September 10, 2019
- Maiden voyage: August 23, 2019
- Identification: Call sign: C6ET4; IMO number: 9797371; MMSI number: 311000995
- Status: In service

General characteristics
- Type: Passenger ship
- Tonnage: 17,545 GT
- Length: 545 ft (166.1 m)
- Beam: 70.5 ft (21.5 m)
- Decks: 10 (11 is the top)
- Installed power: Four diesel-electric generators (Anglo Belgian Corporation 16DV36C)
- Propulsion: Two ABB Azipods (2 × 3 MW)
- Speed: 17 knots (31 km/h; 20 mph) (service); 19.5 knots (36.1 km/h; 22.4 mph) (maximum)
- Capacity: 228
- Crew: 176

Scenic Eclipse is a passenger ship operated by the Scenic Group. The vessel was built at the Uljanik shipyard in Pula, Croatia.

== History ==
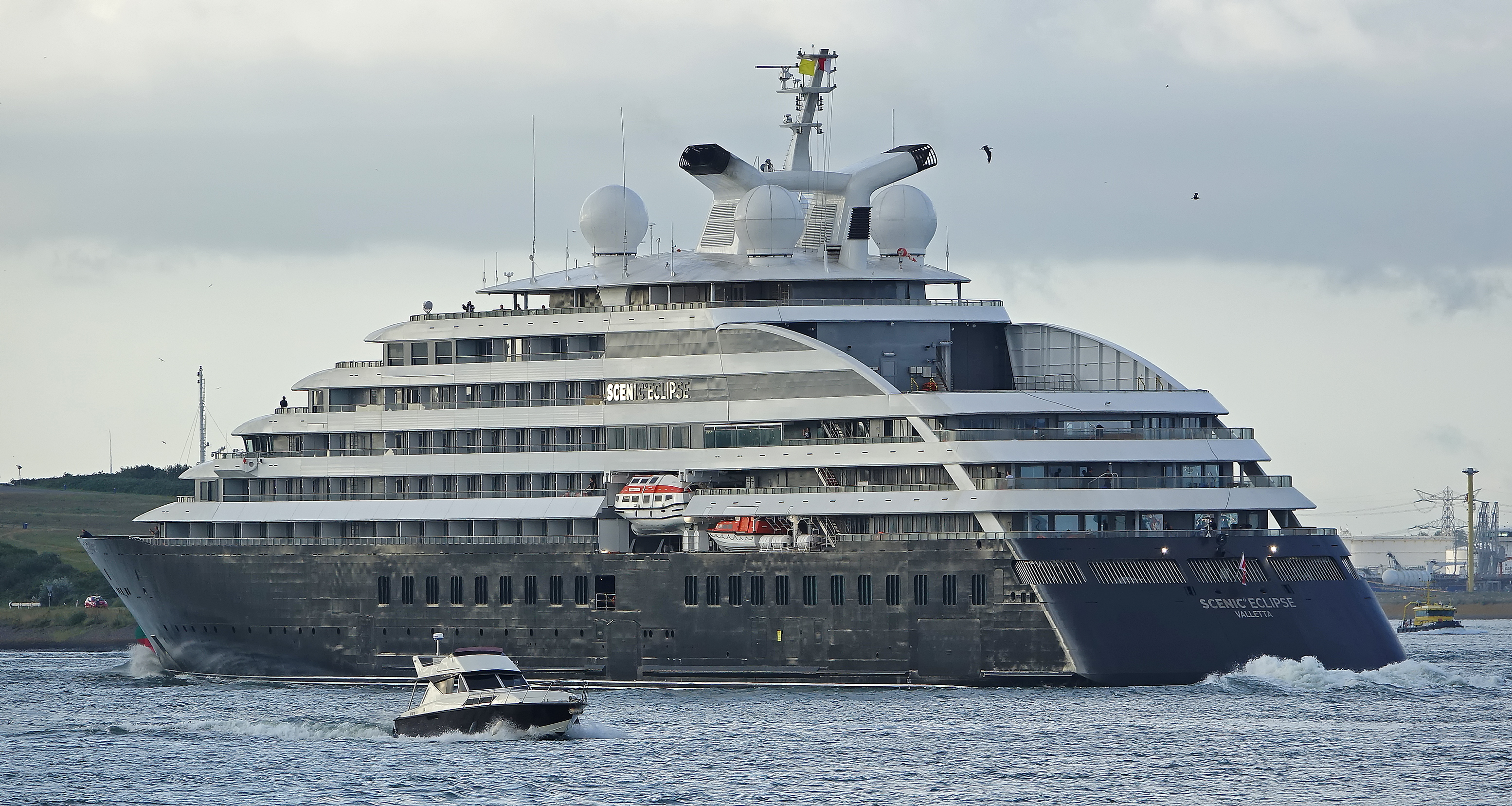
Scenic Eclipse with Svitzer tugs in Hook of Holland

Scenic Group founder and chairman Glen Moroney decided to build Scenic Eclipse after being inspired by Paul Allen's Octopus. The construction of the Scenic Eclipse began in 2017 but was delayed numerous times due to the bankruptcy of the building yard. The vessel finally entered service in August 2019. Scenic Eclipse has a gross tonnage of 17,545.

Scenic Eclipse departed her building yard for the first time on July 27, 2019, for Valletta, Malta, where the vessel was registered, She then sailed to Reykjavík, Iceland, where she embarked her first guests on August 15, 2019, with the maiden voyage ending in Quebec on August 27, 2019. Scenic Eclipse was formally named by the actress Helen Mirren in New York City on September 10, 2019.

== Operation ==
Scenic Eclipse carries up to 228 passengers, although this is limited to 200 in the Polar Regions where an extensive team of expedition staff are embarked to provide lectures, guiding and to operate the vessel's Zodiac Nautic boats. The vessel comprises all suite accommodation with every cabin featuring a balcony.

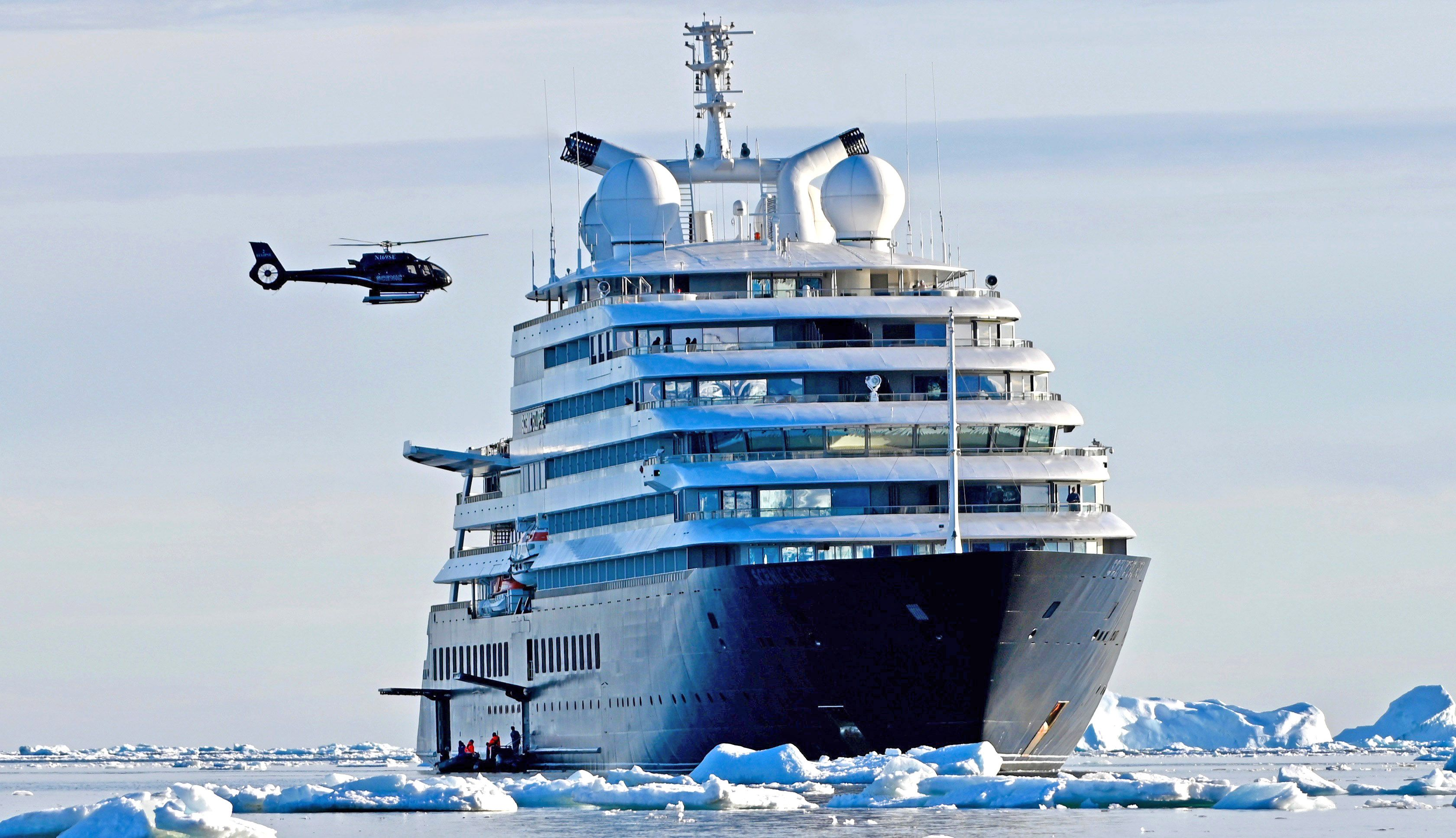
Scenic Eclipse in Antarctica

Scenic Eclipse is equipped with two Eurocopter EC130 Helicopters and also carries a seven-person crewed submersible called Scenic Neptune built by U-Boat Worx which is capable of diving to depths of up to 300 meters.

== Itinerary ==
The vessel is designed and built according to Polar Code Rules and carries a Polar Class 6 notation for operation in Polar Regions While the vessel spends a significant part of the year in the Polar Regions, it also operates regular voyages in the Americas, Europe, Caribbean and South America
