= John Anderson (New Zealand businessman, born 1938) =

New Zealand businessman (1938–2025)

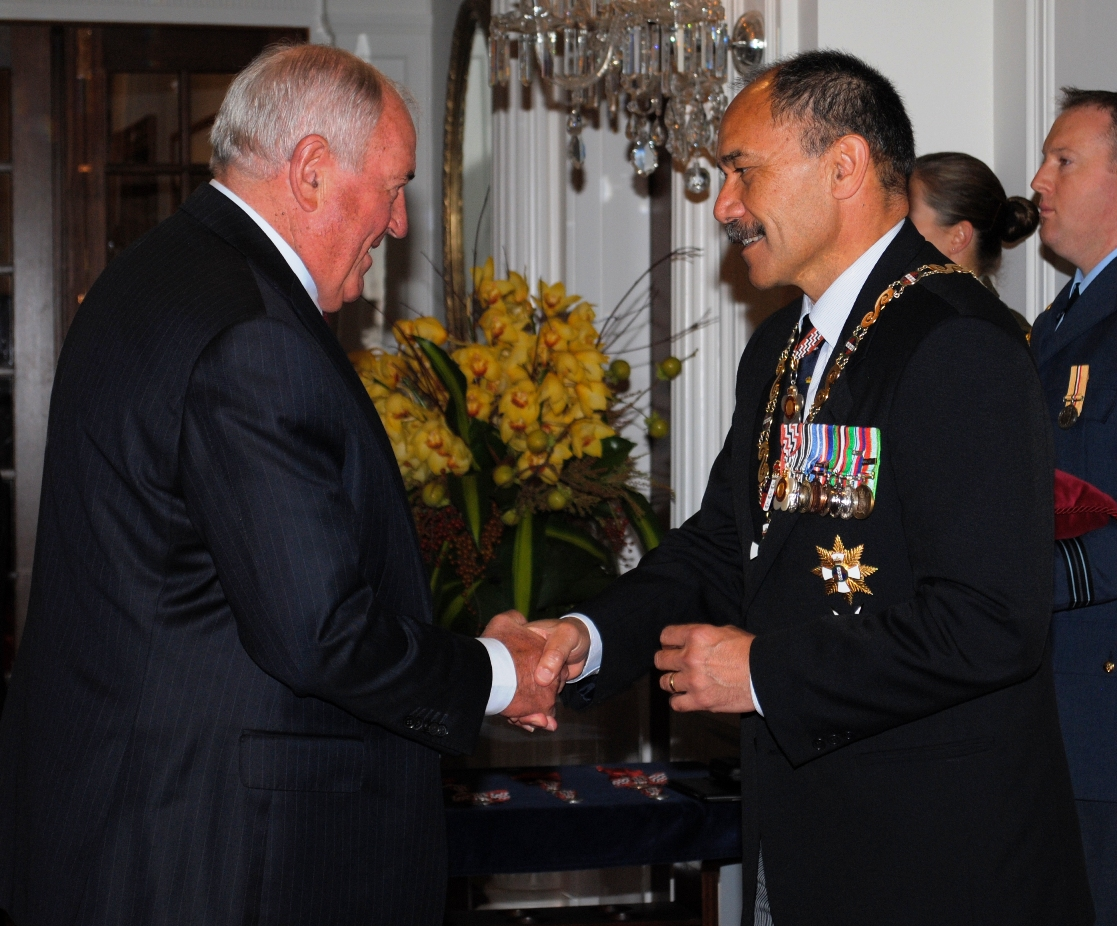
Anderson (left) is congratulated on his investiture as a Member of the New Zealand Order of Merit by the governor-general, Sir Jerry Mateparae, at Government House, Wellington, on 1 May 2012

John Duncan Anderson MNZM (18 November 1938 – 21 February 2025) was a New Zealand businessman, author and speaker. He was the founder of the travel and leisure company Contiki Tours.

== Early life and family ==
Anderson was born in Wellington on 18 November 1938, the son of Betty and Hugh Anderson. Anderson's parents divorced when he was five years old; he was raised primarily by his mother although maintained a good relationship with his father, a dentist who moved first to Auckland and later to London.

== Overseas experience ==
In 1960 Anderson travelled to London, England where his father was living. Anderson planned his route to England to include many stopovers. As the president of his local Jaycees association, Anderson contacted fellow presidents in the cities that he planned and received many offers to host him. In this way, Anderson was able to defray his travel costs considerably.

In his book Only Two Seats Left Anderson describes his travels with a mixture of awe and sense of adventure. This was Anderson's first travel outside of New Zealand.

== The first tours ==
Arriving in England in 1962, Anderson set about planning a trip to see Europe. However, he had only £25 to his name, and so came up with the idea of advertising for 11 other young Australasians to join him on the trip. He worked out the total costs for the trip and then divided by 11, thus providing a free seat for himself.

The trip sold quickly, assisted by Anderson meeting prospective fellow travellers and exaggerating his experience of Europe. In fact, his only previous experience of Europe was an overnight trip to Paris. Shortly after having sold all the seats, Anderson was approached by two more prospective passengers. Anderson decided to take advantage of the interest and advertise a second tour to operate following the first. This second tour also sold well and sold out before the first tour departed.

Despite Anderson's inexperience, the tour was a success. Anderson admitted his lack of European knowledge to his customers on the first day. After that, he and the eleven others shared duties and decision making, including driving duties in the 12-seater Commer van they christened Tiki after the Maori good luck charm.

For the second tour, Anderson increased the price from £100 to £115 per person. Despite this, upon arrival in Monaco Anderson found he had nearly run out of money and would be unable to complete the advertised itinerary. Anderson worked out the amount of money that he would need to express the group directly back to England and took the remaining funds to a casino where he gambled on the roulette tables. He won and was able to continue the tour without his customers finding out.

Anderson married Ali (Alison), a passenger who fell ill on one of Contiki's first tours, and they went on to have four children.

== Contiki Holidays ==
The trips, which had begun as an exercise to fund his own travels around Europe, became a fast-growing business; fleet and staff grew rapidly and a number of new tours were developed under the name Tiki Tours, in recognition of the company's first vehicle.

When the New Zealand Tourist Board challenged Anderson over his use of the name Tiki Tours he changed the company's name to Contiki, the con coming from The Continent.

Contiki grew to include tours worldwide. During the 1980s the company began to diversify from its roots as a tour company for 18- to 35-year-olds (originally 19 to 29). Examples included building hotel resorts in Queenstown and in the Great Barrier Reef, and the purchase of Fullers Ferries.

By the mid-1980s Contiki was a global organisation headquartered in Hong Kong. Anderson was living in New Zealand and travelled frequently for directors meetings and to review the company's operations.

=== Sale of Contiki ===
In the early 1980s Anderson sold down his investment in Contiki, allowing fellow directors to invest as shareholders. In 1985 Omnicorp, a company controlled by Lloyd Morrison purchased a 50% stake in the business.

The stock market crash of 1987 devalued many of Contiki's assets. This, along with the poor performance of recent acquisitions, notably Fullers Ferries, placed Anderson in financial difficulty. In 1989, he was forced to sell his remaining shares in Contiki as well as his family home to avoid bankruptcy.

== After Contiki ==
During the early 1990s Anderson was employed to sell off the assets of former Contiki empire. His wife Ali returned to full-time work to supplement their income. They briefly owned and ran a chain of stores in Auckland selling packaged sandwiches. The business was short-lived and they moved to Blenheim in the late 1990s. Along with Contours Travel, Anderson started tours to South America for 'baby boomers'.

In later years, Anderson took up public speaking as a profession and presented his Contiki story to many businesses.

In 2010 Anderson published Only Two Seats Left, an autobiography that focuses mainly on his time with Contiki from 1961 to 1989.

In the 2012 New Year Honours, Anderson was appointed a Member of the New Zealand Order of Merit, for services to tourism.

Anderson died on 21 February 2025, at the age of 86.
