= Autofähre Beckenried–Gersau =

Swiss car ferry

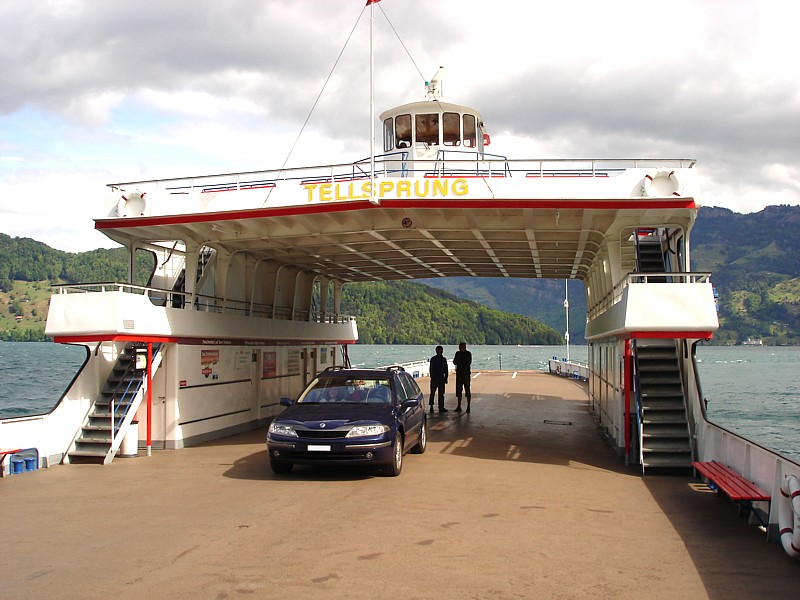
MV Tellsprung sailing on the car ferry service between Beckenried and Gersau

The Autofähre Beckenried–Gersau, or Beckenried–Gersau car ferry, is a Swiss car ferry that operates across the centre of Lake Lucerne between the lakeside towns of Beckenried and Gersau.The 4-kilometre (2.5 mi) crossing takes about 20 minutes and avoids a 50-kilometre (31 mi) round trip by road. It operates from the beginning of April to mid-October.

The service has operated since 1930, with some interruptions during World War II. It still uses the same ferry boat, the motor vessel Tellsprung, which was built in 1929 and extensively rebuilt in 1963.

== See also ==
- Lake Lucerne Navigation Company
- Transport in Switzerland
- List of ferry operators
