= Fraser River Marine Transportation Ltd. =

Fraser River Marine Transportation operated a ferry service, the Albion Ferry, in the Lower Mainland of British Columbia, Canada. The company was a wholly owned subsidiary of the South Coast British Columbia Transportation Authority (TransLink).

Two ferries, the Kulleet and the Klatawa, ran between MacMillan Island in Fort Langley and 240th St in Maple Ridge. The crossing took approximately 10 minutes. The service was shut down on July 31, 2009 upon completion of the new Golden Ears Bridge, just a few kilometres downstream. Both ferries are now for sale, and Translink has almost reached a deal with a person whose name has not yet been released

The two ferries are able to run on either diesel fuel or compressed natural gas.
