= Pacific Victory =

Cruise ship

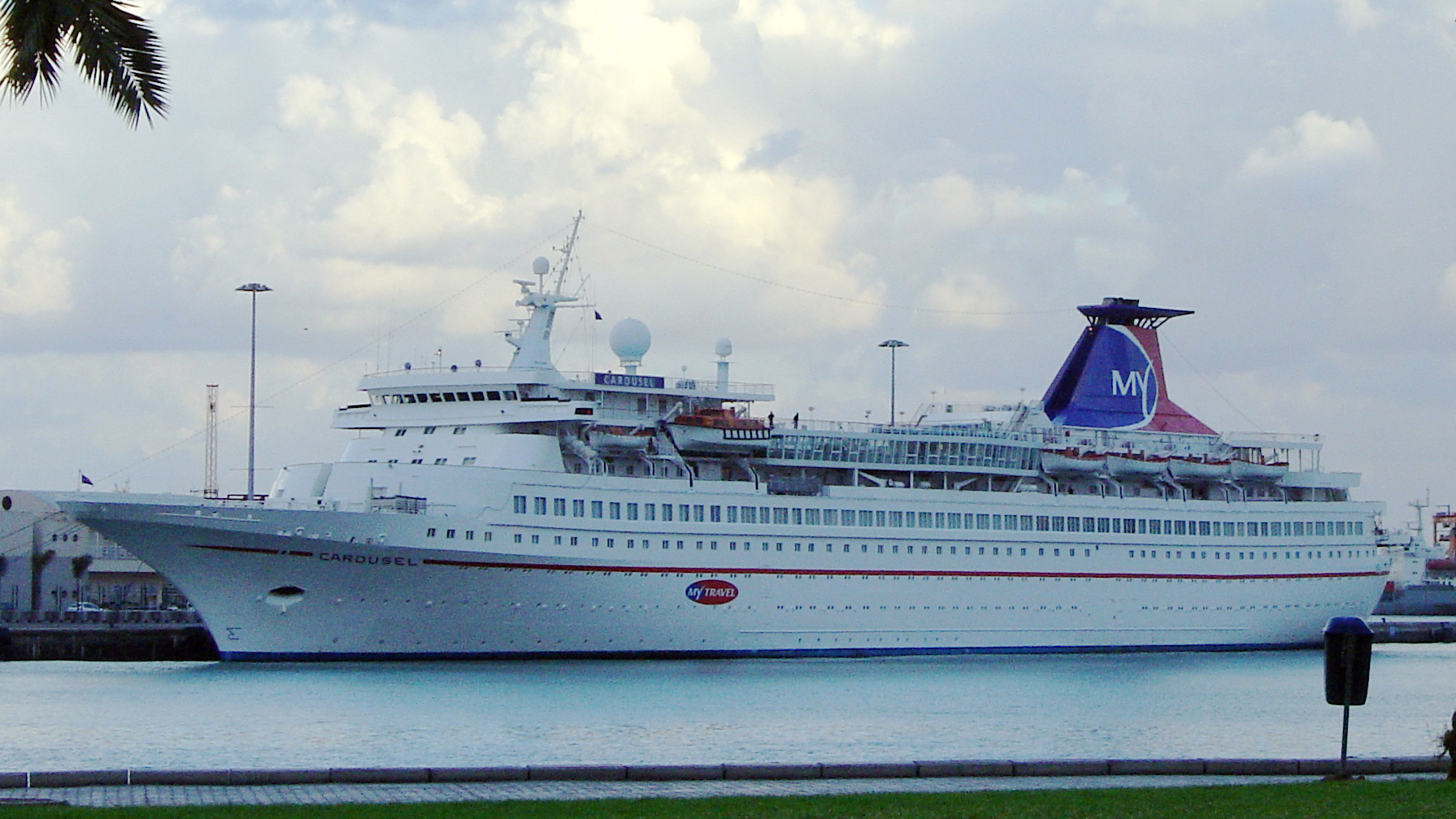
- Carousel in 2004

History
- Name: Nordic Prince (1971-1995); Carousel (1995-2005); Aquamarine (2005-2006); Arielle (2006-2008); Aquamarine (2008-2010); Ocean Star Pacific (2010-2012); Pacific (2012-2014); Pacific Victory (2014-2015)
- Owner: PV Enterprises International
- Port of registry: 1971–1995: Oslo, Norway; 1995–2004: Nassau, Bahamas; 2004–2006: Limassol, Cyprus; 2006–2008: Nassau, Bahamas; 2008–2010: Piraeus, Greece; 2010–2014: Panama City, Panama; 2014–2015: Basseterre, Saint Kitts and Nevis
- Builder: Wärtsilä Helsinki Shipyard, Finland
- Yard number: 393
- Launched: 9 July 1970
- Completed: 8 July 1971
- In service: 1971
- Out of service: 2014
- Identification: Call sign: V4BV3; IMO number: 7027411; MMSI number: 341554000
- Fate: Scrapped at Alang, India in 2015

General characteristics (as built)
- Tonnage: 18,346 GT
- Length: 168.3 metres (552 ft)
- Beam: 24.01 metres (78.8 ft)
- Draught: 6.8 metres (22 ft)
- Speed: 21 knots
- Capacity: 714 passengers (lower berths)

General characteristics (after 1980 rebuild)
- Tonnage: 23,149 GT
- Length: 193.65 metres (635.3 ft)
- Beam: 24.01 metres (78.8 ft)
- Draught: 6.72 metres (22.0 ft)
- Speed: 21 knots
- Capacity: 1,231 passengers (lower berths)

Pacific Victory was a cruise ship. She was built in 1971 by Wärtsilä Helsinki Shipyard, Finland for Royal Caribbean and christened as Nordic Prince. She subsequently sailed under the names of Carousel, Aquamarine, Arielle and Ocean Star Pacific.

== History ==
Nordic Prince was the second ship to be built for Royal Caribbean, and one of the first modern purpose-built cruise ships. She was launched on 9 July 1970, and entered service on 31 July 1971. Like her older sister ship, Song of Norway, she was used for cruising on the Caribbean with Miami as the starting port. In June 1980, the ship was lengthened at Wärtsilä Helsinki by 26 meters. When Royal Caribbean acquired new ships in the late 1980s, Nordic Prince was used for cruising around the world.

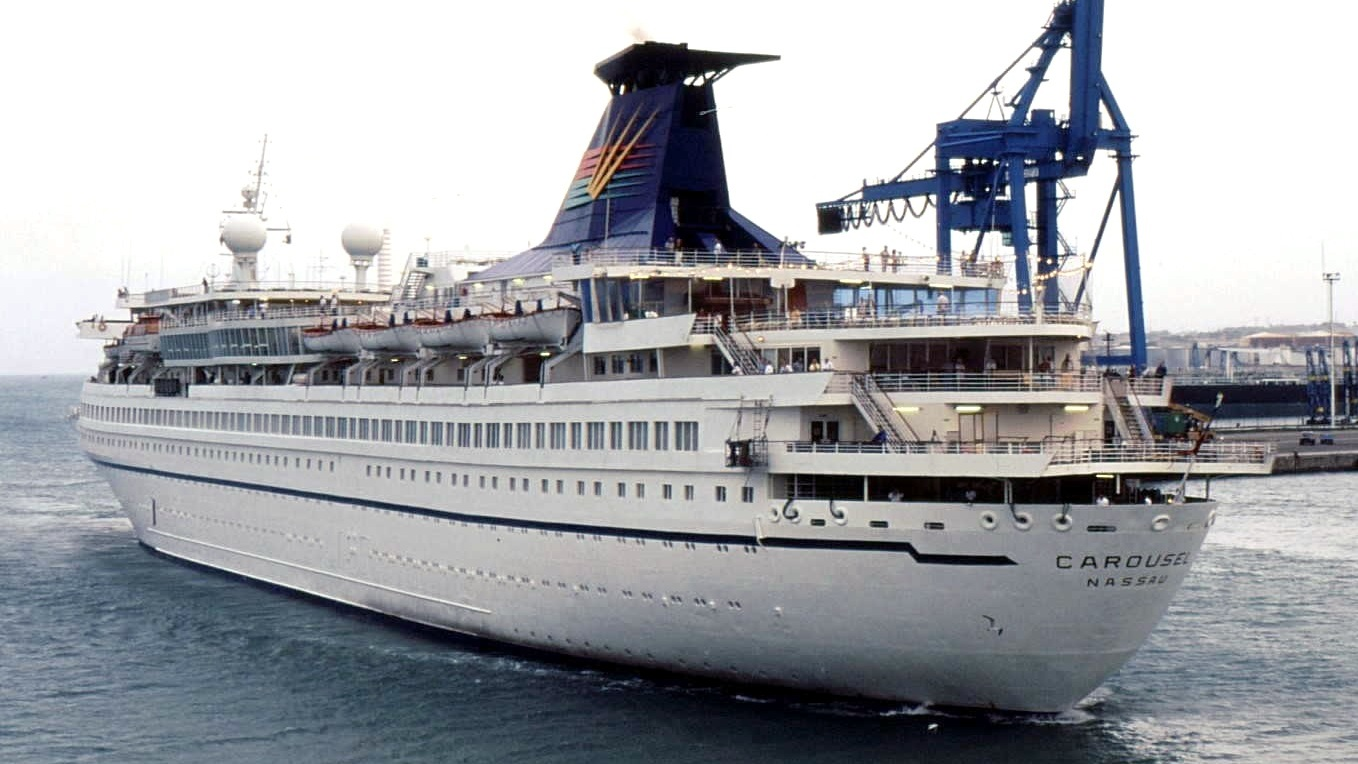
The Carousel in September 1995.

Nordic Prince became the first Royal Caribbean ship to be supplanted by larger tonnage in March 1995, when she was sold to Sun Cruises. Before the ship entered service for her new owners, the sky lounge around her funnel was removed. Renamed Carousel, the ship began cruising for Sun Cruises on 6 May 1995. During her time with Sun Cruises she spent summers cruising on the Mediterranean but during the winter seasons she returned to the Caribbean. In February 2000, Carousel was grounded near Cancún, Mexico, which led to cancellation of five cruises while she was being repaired. Toward the end of her service with Sun Cruises the ship received MyTravel funnel colours. In the early 2000s, Sun Cruises started pulling out of the cruise business. In July 2004, Carousel was sold to Louis Cruise Lines, Cyprus, but chartered back to Sun Cruises until May 2005. Carousel was the last Sun Cruises ship in service.

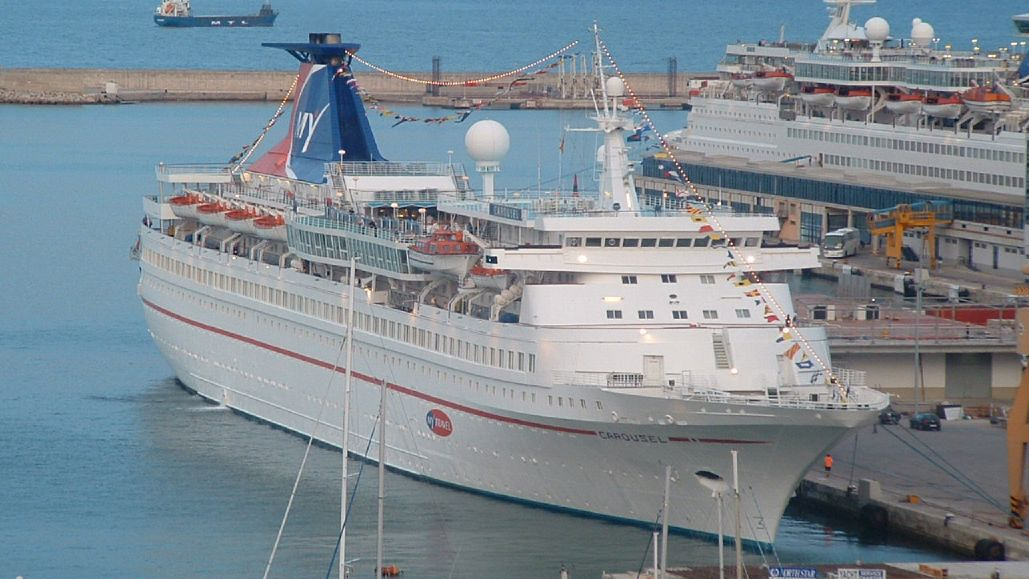
The Carousel in May 2003.

Louis Cruise Lines renamed the ship Aquamarine and starting from June 2005, she was used on 7-day cruises around the Mediterranean with Genoa as the starting port. In April 2006, the ship was chartered for five years to Transocean Tours who renamed her Arielle. However, the charter was apparently terminated by early 2008, when the ship returned to Louis fleet and reverted to the name Aquamarine.

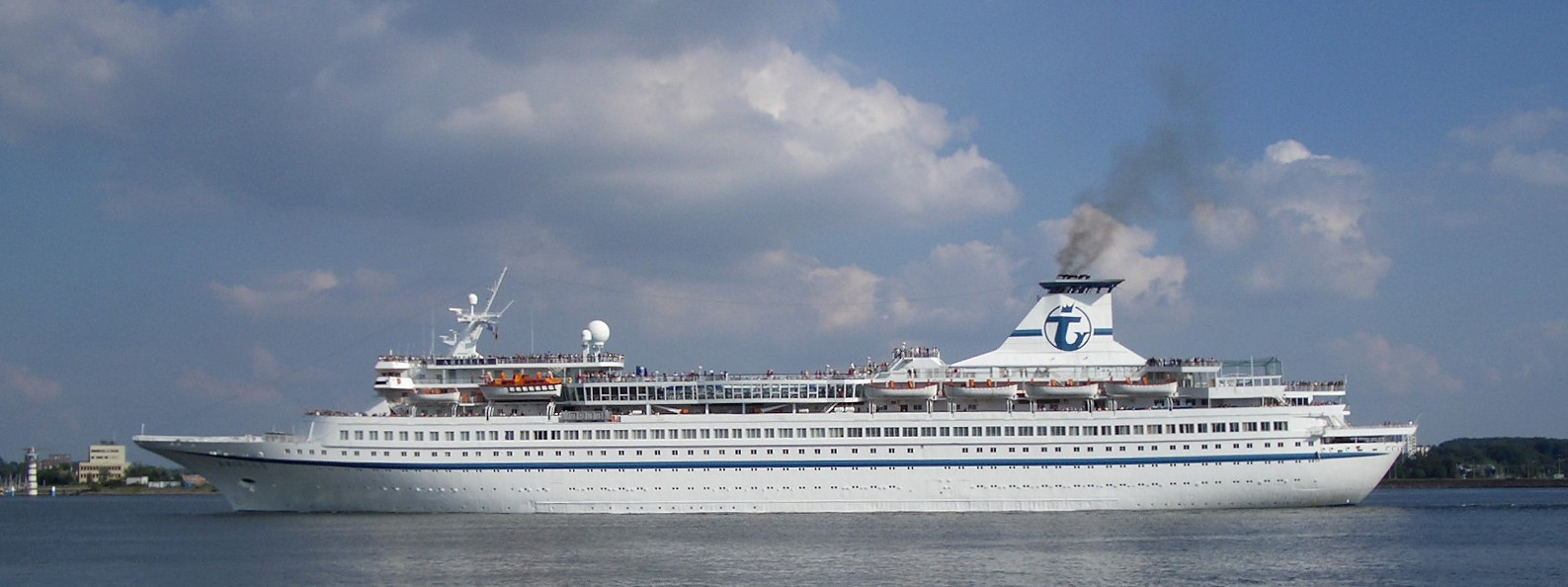
The Arielle in Kiel in 2007.

In May 2008, Aquamarine was diverted to Milos, an island in the Aegean Sea, after a 1.5-meter gash was found on its hull at about 1.5 m above the water line. The ship's hull was damaged after it scraped against a pier during its departure from the port of Iraklio, in Crete, to the resort island of Santorini. The 872 passengers and the 407 crewmembers on board were safe.

In December 2010, Louis Cruises announced they would be continuing the renewal of their fleet by selling Aquamarine to Mexican operator Ocean Star Cruises, which renamed her Ocean Star Pacific. In March 2011, Ocean Star Pacific was moored at Caracas Bay, on Curaçao, for maintenance. She entered service for Ocean Star Cruises on 10 April 2011. On 15 April 2011 the Ocean Star Pacific was disabled at Huatulco, Mexico, due to a fire in the engine room.

She crossed the Mexican riviera after undergoing an extensive repair process in Salina Cruz, Mexico, but suffered another breakdown on 26 July 2011, in her cooling systems and air conditioning. She was planned to sail through 17 April 2012.

PV Enterprises International acquired the vessel in May 2012, and received seaworthiness certification in July 2012, changing the name to Pacific in November 2012. In December 2014, the vessel, sailing under the name Pacific Victory, ran aground in Sarangani Bay, Manila, while en route to Alang, India, for ship breaking. In February 2015, Pacific arrived in Alang for decommissioning.

Nordic Prince was briefly seen in the opening scene of the season 2 episode of Miami Vice Trust Fund Pirates.

== Sister ships ==
- Formosa Queen
- Sun Viking
