= Transit Scenic Tours =

- Parent: Wayne Nelson
- Commenced operation: 1932
- Headquarters: Bankstown
- Service area: Sydney
- Service type: Coach operator
- Depots: 1
- Fleet: 13 (October 2014)
- Website: www.transitscenic.com.au

Transit Scenic Tours is an Australian coach company in Sydney.

== History ==
In August 1955, Messers Appleby and Nelson purchased route 129 Rockdale to Tempe Bus Depot. In May 1963, route 120 Stanmore to Lilyfield was purchased, followed in August 1965 by route 227 Sydenham to Stanmore. On 6 December 1965, all three route were combined as route 129 Rockdale to Rozelle. The operation initially traded as Appleby & Nelson, later being renamed Tempe Bus Service.

In November 1987, the route was renumbered 450. On 1 October 1988, it was sold to Arrow Coaches and later passed to Sydney Buses' Tempe depot becoming part of route 425. At the same time, route 449 Sydenham station to Petersham station via Marrickville Metro Shopping Centre was introduced, it ceased on 25 January 1990.

A coach charter business was also operated under the Transit Scenic Tours banner. After the disposal of the route service, this continued. Some coaches were signwritten for Nelson's Coaches. From 1988 until August 1993, a service was operated between the domestic and international terminals at Sydney Airport under contract to Ansett Australia under the Intershuttle brand.

== Fleet ==
As at October 2016, the fleet consisted of 14 buses and coaches. Fleet livery was originally white and orange. This was replaced by a blue and white livery. In 1990, a new livery of white with yellow signwriting was introduced.

== Depot ==
From its inception, Transit Scenic Tours operated out of a depot in Marsh Street, Arncliffe. After it was compulsorily acquired to make way for the M5 South Western Motorway, a depot was established in Homebush Bay, later moving to Bankstown.
