= Lüftner Cruises =

Cruise operator based in Innsbruck

- Company type: Private
- Industry: Cruises
- Founded: 1994
- Founder: Wolfgang and Martina Lüftner
- Headquarters: Innsbruck, Austria
- Website: https://www.lueftner-cruises.com/en

Lüftner Cruises, also operating under Amadeus River Cruises, is a cruise operator based in Innsbruck, Austria that offers European river cruises.

== History ==
The Lüftner family has been involved in modern European river cruising since the 1970s, having previously operated Lufter Reizen. Lüftner Cruises was founded in 1994 by Wolfgang Lüftner and Martina Lüftner and remains a family business. At first the company only used chartered ships. In 1997, it began to establish its own fleet with the construction of MS Amadeus. It is often credited with helping to launch the river cruise industry In 2015, the company started calling at Australia. In response to the COVID-19 pandemic in Europe Luftner suspended all river cruises from March 2020-June 2021.

== Amadeus fleet ==
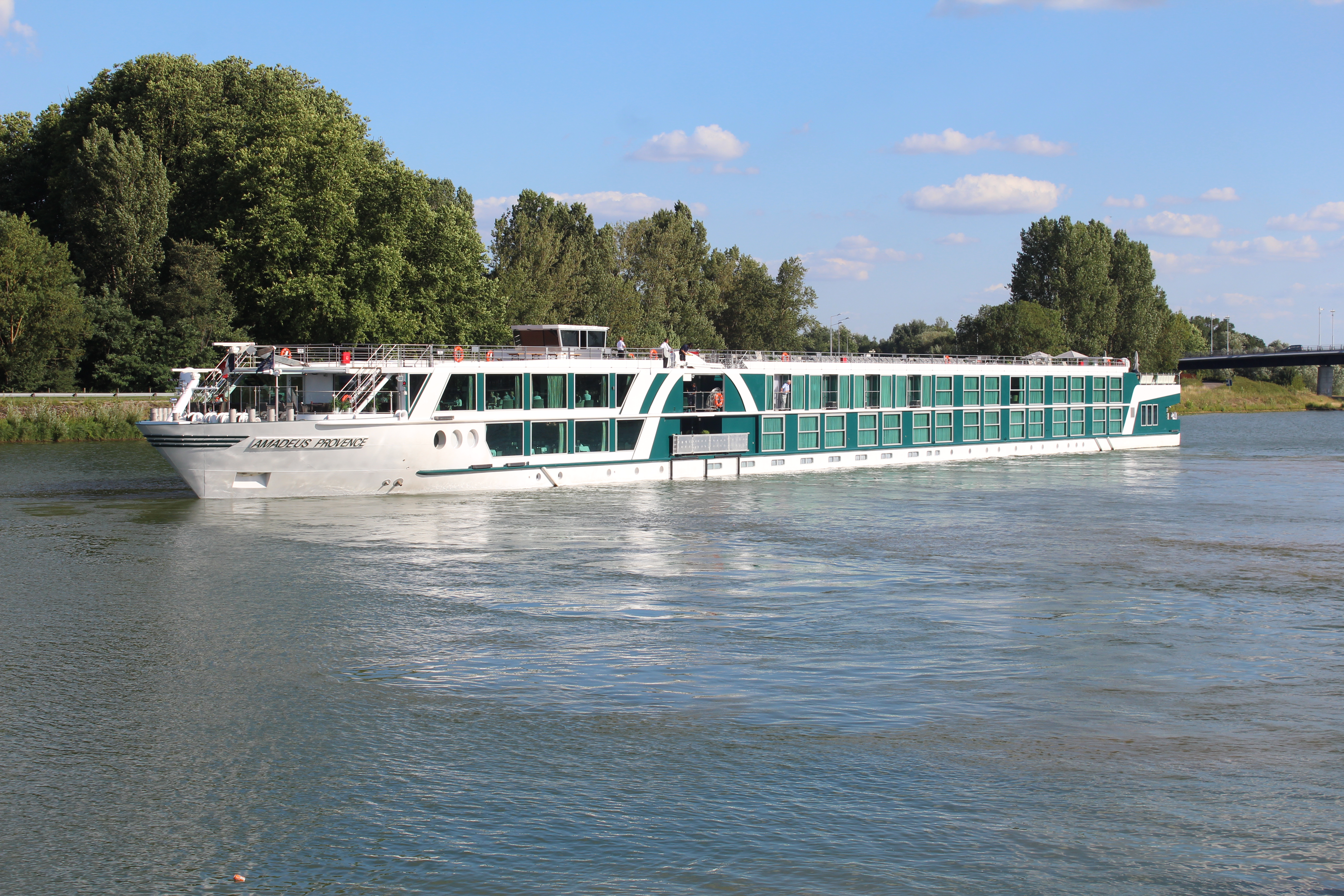
Amadeus Provence

As of 2024, Lüftner Cruises had a fleet of 16 Amadeus ships, which have been built by the De Hoop Shipyards in the Netherlands. with the exception of Amadeus Star, built by GS Yard. In 2020, the company placed an order for Amadeus Cara.

Ship	Entered service	Length	Passengers	Flag
Amadeus Nova	2024	135 × 11.4 m	158	DE
Amadeus Riva	2023	135 × 11.4 m	158	DE
Amadeus Cara	2022	135 × 11.4 m	162	DE
Amadeus Imperial	2020	135 × 11.4 m	168	DE
Amadeus Star	2019	135 × 11.4 m	164	DE
Amadeus Queen	2018	135 × 11.4 m	162	DE
Amadeus Silver III	2016	135 × 11.4 m	168	DE
Amadeus Silver II	2015	135 × 11.4 m	168	DE
A-Silver	2013	135 × 11.4 m	180	DE
Amadeus Provence	2017	110 × 11.4 m	140	DE
Amadeus Diamond	2009 (renovated 2019)	110 × 11.4 m	146	DE
Amadeus Brilliant	2011 (renovated 2020)	110 × 11.4 m	150	DE
Amadeus Elegant	2010	110 × 11.4 m	150	DE

== Cruises ==
Amadeus ships cover many European countries (Austria, Slovakia, Serbia, Croatia, Bulgaria, Romania, Hungary, Germany, France, Belgium and the Netherlands), various rivers (the Danube, Rhine, Main, Mosel, Rhône, Saône and Seine) and also Belgian and Dutch inland waterways. The company also runs themed cruises for golfers and fans of classical music.

== Awards ==
- 2013: "River Ship of the Year 2013" (Flussschiff des Jahres 2013) for the Amadeus Silver II, presented by the Kreuzfahrt Guide
- 2011: "Green Globe Highest Achievement Award 2011" (Cruise category) presented by Green Globe
