= Emerald Cruises =

Cruise line

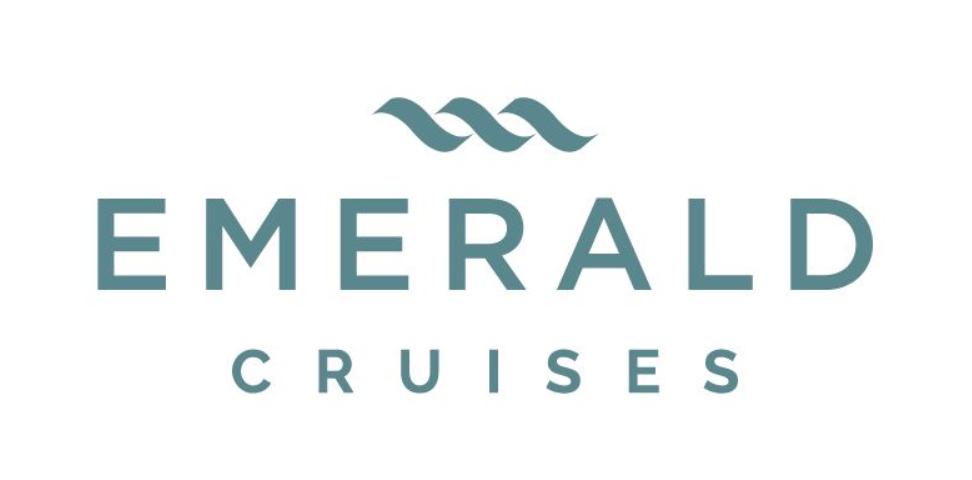
- Trade name: Emerald Cruises
- Formerly: Emerald Waterways (2013-21) Emerald Yacht Cruises (2013-21)
- Type: Privately held company
- Industry: Tourism
- Products: Cruising
- Parent: Scenic Group
- Website: emerald.cruises

Emerald Cruises is a cruise line headquartered in Zug, Switzerland, formerly known as the river cruise line Emerald Waterways and ocean yacht service Emerald Yacht Cruises, and part of the Scenic Group.

== History ==
Emerald Waterways was founded in 2013 by Glen Moroney, as a division of Scenic. It offered its first cruises on the rivers of Europe in 2014 on the 180-passenger Emerald Sky.

In 2018, the company announced its first non-European ship, the 84-passenger Emerald Harmony, to provide cruises between Ho Chi Minh City, Vietnam and Siem Reap, Cambodia. It also announced its expansion into yacht cruising, chartering the MV Adriatic Princess to offer cruises on Croatia's Dalmatian coast on the Adriatic Sea.

In February 2020, Emerald Cruises became the umbrella brand for Emerald Waterways and Emerald Yacht Cruises, a new ocean cruise line. In addition, it announced an upcoming launch of Emerald Azzurra, the first ship launched by Emerald Yacht Cruises, providing ocean cruises to the Adriatic, Mediterranean and Red Sea.

== Fleet ==
Emerald Cruises operates eight river ships, one yacht, two chartered river ships, and two chartered yachts. Emerald Azzura delivered in February 2022 with starts in Jordan.

=== Owned ===
Ship Name	Year Launched	Type	Length	Crew	Guests	Staterooms	Suites
Emerald Sky	2014	River cruiser	135 m	51	180	19	72
Emerald Star	2014	River cruiser	135 m	51	180	19	72
Emerald Sun	2015	River cruiser	135 m	51	180	19	72
Emerald Dawn	2015	River cruiser	135 m	51	180	19	72
Emerald Radiance	2017	River cruiser	89 m	37	112	10	46
Emerald Liberté	2017	River cruiser	110 m	47	136	15	54
Emerald Destiny	2017	River cruiser	135 m	51	180	19	72
Emerald Harmony	2019	River cruiser	73 m	40	84	4	38
Emerald Luna	2021	River cruiser	135 m	51	180	19	72
Emerald Astra	2026	River cruiser	135 m	51	180	19	72
Emerald Azzura	2022	Yacht	110 m	72	100	35	15
Emerald Sakara	2023	Yacht	110 m	72	100	35	15
Emerald Kaia	2026	Yacht	110 m	72	100	35	15
Emerald Raiya	2027	Yacht	110 m	72	100	35	15
Emerald Xara	2028	Yacht	110 m	72	100	35	15

=== Former ===
Ship Name	Year built / Refurbished	Type	Length	Crew	Guests	Cabins
MV Adriatic Pearl	2012	Yacht	41m	8	36	18
MV Adriatic Princess	2017	Yacht	45m	8	36	18
MS Hamees	2018	River cruiser	72m	43	142	72
MV Rossia	2018	River cruiser	125m	110	224	106
MS Swallow	2019	Yacht	49m	7	36	18
MV Lastavica	2019	Yacht	49m	7	36	18
