= Ocean Star Cruises =

- Industry: Transportation
- Founded: April 2011
- Defunct: July 2011
- Headquarters: Mexico City, Mexico
- Key people: Henry Yaniz (President)
- Products: Cruises
- Parent: Corporación de Cruceros Nacionales
- Website: www.oceanstar.com.mx

Ocean Star Cruises is a Mexican cruise line based in Mexico City. It was founded in 2010, the first Mexican cruise line. The first ship in its fleet was the Ocean Star Pacific, launched on 9 July 1970 for Royal Caribbean International, purchased in December 2010 to become the first ship in the fleet. It officially entered service on April 10, 2011.

The Ocean Star Pacific sailed the waters of the Mexican Riviera, with embarkation ports at Acapulco and Manzanillo. The company planned to expand its fleet to include six newly built vessels in the next five years. After the ship encountered generator problems, it was withdrawn in July 2011 and laid up in Mazatlan.

== Fleet ==
Ship	Built	Entered service for Ocean Star Cruises	Gross Tonnage	Flag	Notes
Ocean Star Pacific	1971	2011	23,149 GT	Panama	Laid up, ex-Nordic Prince with Royal Caribbean International, scrapped at Alang Ship Breaking Yard
