= AmaWaterways =

River cruise company in California, US

AmaWaterways, LLC
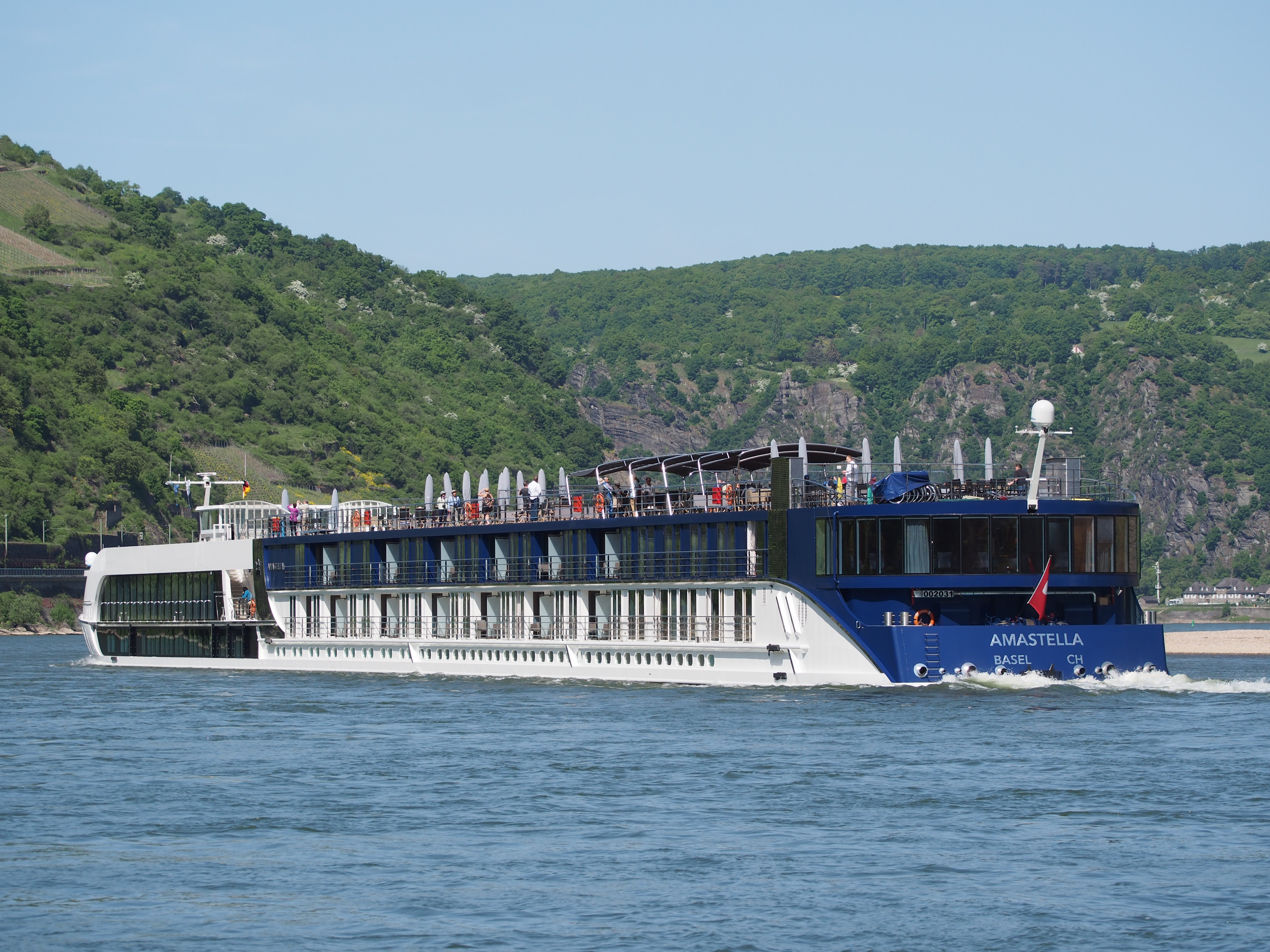
- AmaStella on the Rhine
- Type: Private
- Industry: River cruise company, cruise line
- Founded: 2002; 24 years ago
- Headquarters: Calabasas, California, United States
- Services: River cruises
- Website: www.amawaterways.com

AmaWaterways is a Calabasas, California based luxury river cruise company founded in 2002 by Rudi Schreiner, Kristin Karst, and Jimmy Murphy. AmaWaterways currently operates 29 ships that offer cruises in Europe, Southern Africa, Southeast Asia, South America, and Egypt. AmaWaterways has a reputation for spacious vessels, wellness amenities, and fine dining.

== History ==
=== Founding and early years (2002-2010) ===
AmaWaterways (originally Amadeus Waterways) was founded in 2002 by Rudi Schreiner, Kristin Karst and Jimmy Murphy. The company rebranded to AMA Waterways in 2008. Its first fully owned ship, AmaDagio, debuted in 2006.

=== Growth and fleet expansion (2011-2018) ===
From 2011 the line expanded its fleet and amenities. Amacerto (launched 2012) introduced 135-m vessels with "twin-balcony" staterooms and multiple dining venues. In Asia, the all-suite AmaDara entered Mekong service in 2015. The Rhine-sailing AmaKristina debuted in 2017 with connecting and triple-occupancy cabins aimed at multigenerational travel. A pilot Wellness Program began in 2017 and was expanded across additional ships in 2018.

=== Innovations and partnerships (2015-present) ===
In 2015 Adventures by Disney began chartering AmaWaterways ships for family-focused Danube and Rhine itineraries, including sailings on AmaViola. The double-width AmaMagna entered service on the Danube in 2019, offering larger suites, four restaurants and efficiency measures that were projected to reduce fuel consumption by 20-25%. In 2024 the company reported record sales; by early 2025 bookings for 2025 were tracking 31% higher year-over-year. Recent and announced fleet moves include AmaMagdalena (launched on Colombia's Magdalena River in April 2025) and sister ship AmaMelodia (scheduled 2025), AmaSintra on Portugal's Douro (2025), a 2027 sister to AmaMagna (marketed as AmaRudi) and a new Mekong ship, AmaMaya, slated for 2026.

== Present day ==
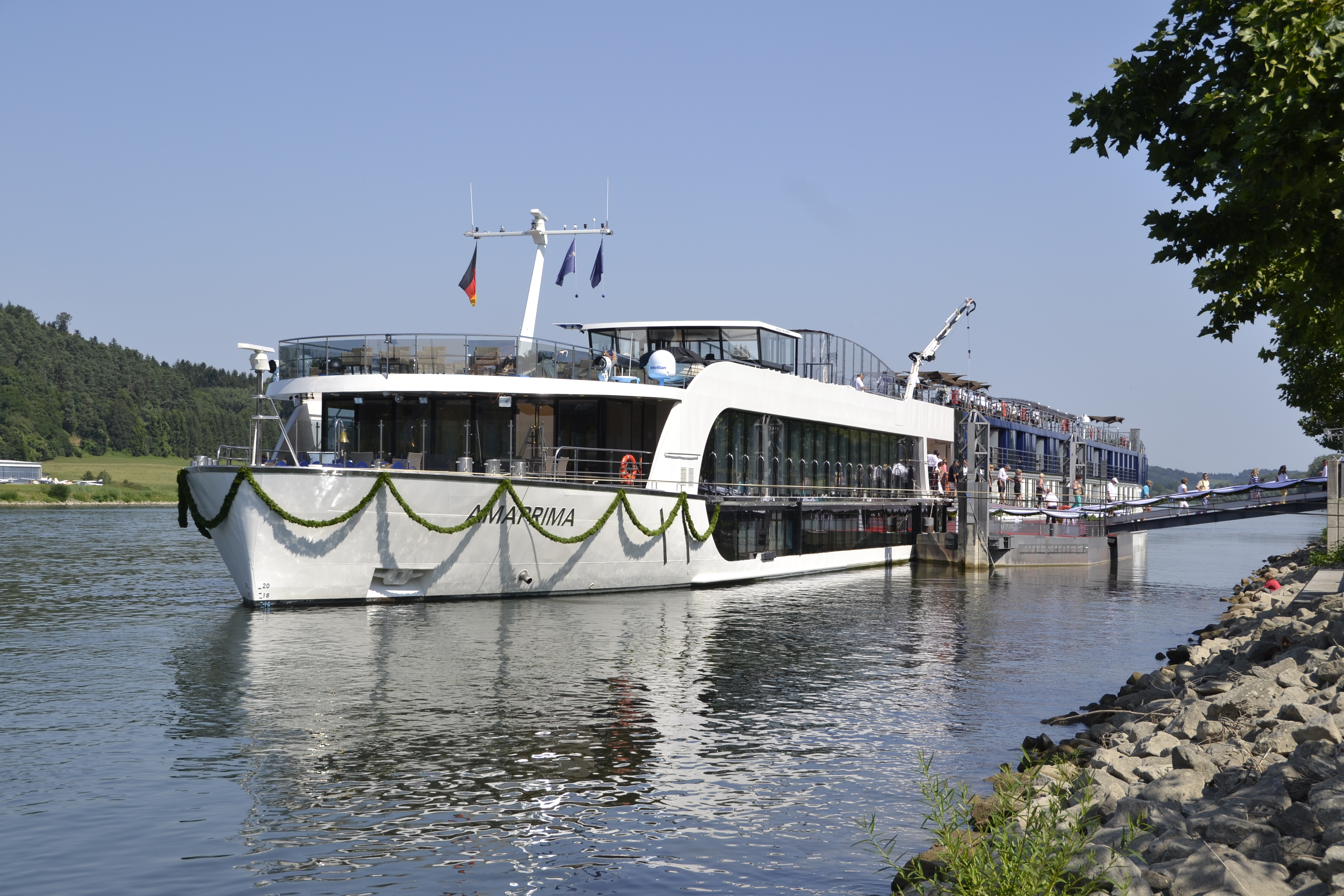
The AmaPrima on the Danube

AmaWaterways cruise ships ply a number of rivers in Europe, including the Danube, Rhine, Seine, Douro, Moselle, Main, Garonne, and Rhône. Outside Europe, their ships cruise the Magdalena, Mekong, and Chobe rivers.

Cruises are full-board and include wine and beer with meals as well as a cocktail hour. AmaWaterways ships feature spa amenities, pools, gyms, and libraries, with some vessels also offering hair and nail services.

=== Activities and excursions ===
AmaWaterways offers multiple included shore excursions each day-typically city tours, guided hikes, exclusive guided bike tours and special-interest tastings-run in small groups and offered at three activity levels (gentle, regular, active). Complimentary bicycles are carried aboard for guided rides or independent exploration, and the line also offers a Concierge Golf Program on select itineraries.

On the 14-night Grand Danube Cruise, excursions include visits to multiple UNESCO sites and landmark venues: Austria's Wachau Valley and Melk Abbey; Salzburg's historic center; the medieval town of Český Krumlov; Bulgaria's Rock-Hewn Churches of Ivanovo; plus scenic transits of the Iron Gates gorge and tours of Golubac and Belgrade (Kalemegdan) Fortresses. These options expand the line's traditional guided walking program and cater to cyclists, golfers and other active travelers.

== Special interest cruises ==
To attract multi-generational families, AmaWaterways partnered with Adventures by Disney to create Disney-themed cruises that feature the Christmas markets in cities on the Danube and Rhine rivers, among others.

The company has also offered promotions for solo travellers. On four ships (the AmaDolce, AmaLyra, AmaCello, and AmaDante), single cabins are available without a supplemental fee.

== Fleet ==
As of 2026, AmaWaterways had a fleet of 30 ships. One of these, the AmaMagna, is the largest cruise ship on the Danube. Roughly twice as wide as other cruise ships on the Danube, the AmaMagna was designed to offer passengers roomier accommodations and more dining options than would be possible on a narrower river cruise ship.

| Ship | Entered service | Length | Width | Staterooms | Passengers | Flag | Register No. | Photo |
|---|---|---|---|---|---|---|---|---|
| AmaBella | 2010 | 443 ft (135 m) | 38 ft (12 m) | 80 | 160 | | ENI 02332082 | |
| AmaCello | 2008 | 360 ft (110 m) | 38 ft (12 m) | 71 | 140 | | ENI 02329809 | |
| AmaCerto | 2012 | 443 ft (135 m) | 38 ft (12 m) | 81 | 162 | | ENI 07001949 | |
| AmaDahlia | 2021 | 236 ft (72 m) | 42.6 ft (13 m) | 36 | 72 | (Egypt) | | |
| AmaDante | 2008 | 360 ft (110 m) | 38 ft (12 m) | 71 | 140 | | ENI 02329183 | |
| AmaDara | 2015 | 302 ft (92 m) | 46 ft (14 m) | 62 | 124 | (Vietnam) | | |
| AmaDolce | 2009 | 360 ft (110 m) | 38 ft (12 m) | 71 | 140 | | ENI 02331267 | |
| AmaDouro | 2019 | 260 ft (79 m) | 37 ft (11 m) | 51 | 102 | (Portugal) | | |
| AmaKristina | 2017 | 443 ft (135 m) | 38 ft (12 m) | 76 | 152 | | | |
| AmaLea | 2018 | 443 ft (135 m) | 38 ft (12 m) | 78 | 156 | | | |
| AmaLilia | | 236 ft (72 m) | 47.6 ft (15 m) | 41 | 82 | (Egypt) | | |
| AmaLucia | 2021 | 443 ft (135 m) | 38 ft (12 m) | 78 | 156 | | ENI 07002142 | |
| AmaLyra | 2009 | 360 ft (110 m) | 38 ft (12 m) | 71 | 140 | | | |
| AmaMagdalena | | 223 ft (68 m) | 43 ft (13 m) | 30 | 60 | (Colombia) | | |
| AmaMagna | 2019 | 443 ft (135 m) | 72 ft (22 m) | 98 | 196 | | | |
| AmaMelodia | | 223 ft (68 m) | 43 ft (13 m) | 32 | 64 | (Colombia) | | |
| AmaMora | 2019 | 443 ft (135 m)m | 38 ft (12 m) | 78 | 156 | | | |
| AmaPrima | 2013 | 443 ft (135 m) | 38 ft (12 m) | 81 | 162 | | ENI 07001958 | |
| AmaReina | 2014 | 443 ft (135 m) | 38 ft (12 m) | | 162 | | ENI 02335818 | |
| AmaSerena | 2015 | 443 ft (135 m) | 38 ft (12 m) | 81 | 162 | | ENI 07002014 | |
| AmaSiena | 2021 | 443 ft (135 m) | 38 ft (12 m) | 78 | 156 | | | |
| AmaSintra | | 260 ft (79 m) | 37 ft (11 m) | 51 | 102 | (Portugal) | | |
| AmaSofia | 2026 | 443 ft (135 m) | 39 ft (12 m) | 76 | 152 | | | |
| AmaSonata | 2014 | 443 ft (135 m) | 38 ft (12 m) | 81 | 162 | | ENI 07001981 | |
| AmaStella | 2016 | 443 ft (135 m) | 38 ft (12 m) | 78 | 156 | | | |
| AmaVenita | 2014 | 443 ft (135 m) | 38 ft (12 m) | 81 | 162 | | ENI 07002005 | |
| AmaVerde | 2011 | 443 ft (135 m) | 38 ft (12 m) | 80 | 160 | | | |
| AmaVida | 2013 | 260 ft (79 m) | 37 ft (11 m) | 51 | 102 | (Portugal) | | |
| AmaViola | 2016 | 443 ft (135 m) | 38 ft (12 m) | 78 | 156 | | | |
| Zambezi Queen | 2009 | 150 ft (46 m) | 25.6 ft (8 m) | 14 | 28 | (Namibia) | | |

== Awards and recognition ==
- TravelAge West WAVE Awards (2019) - Best River Cruise Line, Best Onboard Dining, Best River Cruise Line for Families, Best New Ship AmaLea
- Cruise Critic's Best in Cruise Awards (2024) - Best River Cruise Line and Best for Active Cruisers
- Global Traveler Leisure Lifestyle Awards (2023) - Cruise Line of the Year and Best River Cruise Line

== Sustainability ==
AmaWaterways has introduced a range of measures to reduce fuel use, waste and emissions. Its double-width AmaMagna employs a diesel-electric setup with ten smaller engines that can be engaged as needed, a configuration reported to cut fuel consumption by ~20-25%. In 2023 the ship added solar panels on select balcony awnings to assist with heating/cooling loads. By 2024 the line said all ships could connect to shoreside electric power while in port.

The company highlights single-use plastic reductions (paper straws, water stations, refillable water bottles, refillable bathroom dispensers), recycled-material luggage tags, and the MyAmaCruise app to reduce paper usage. Navigation and efficiency pilots have included a riverbed "Track Pilot" system on select ships. In 2020, AmaKristina became the first river cruise ship to receive Green Award certification; additional European fleet vessels were recognized soon after.

== Leadership ==
AmaWaterways was founded in 2002 by Rudi Schreiner, Kristin Karst and Jimmy Murphy. In February 2025, former Disney and Airbnb executive Catherine Powell joined as president; on 1 July 2025 she became CEO as Schreiner moved to chairman of the board. Co-founder Karst transitioned from executive vice president to chief brand ambassador in 2025.
