= River cruise =

Voyage along inland waterways

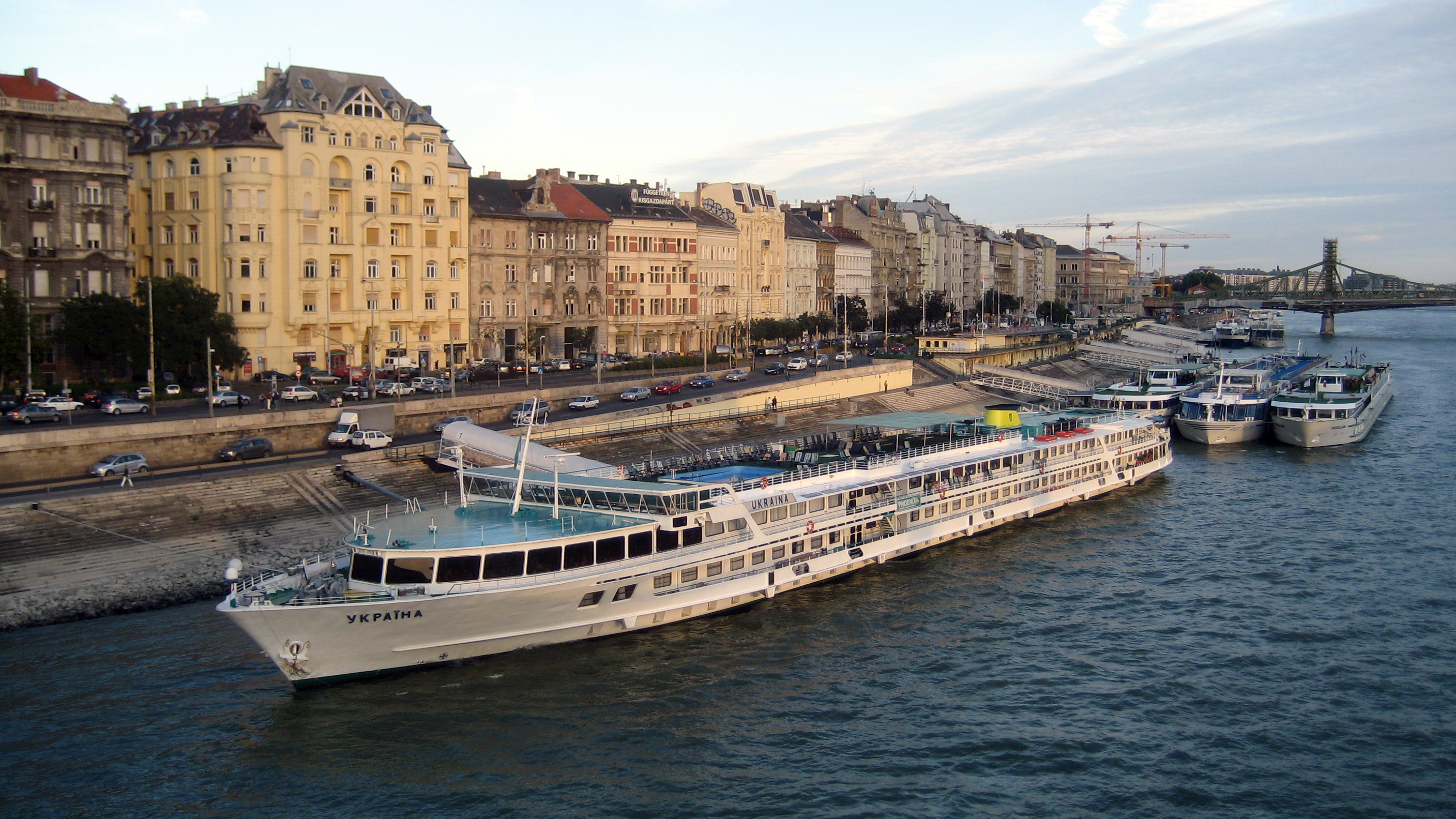
River cruise ships docked along on the Danube in Budapest

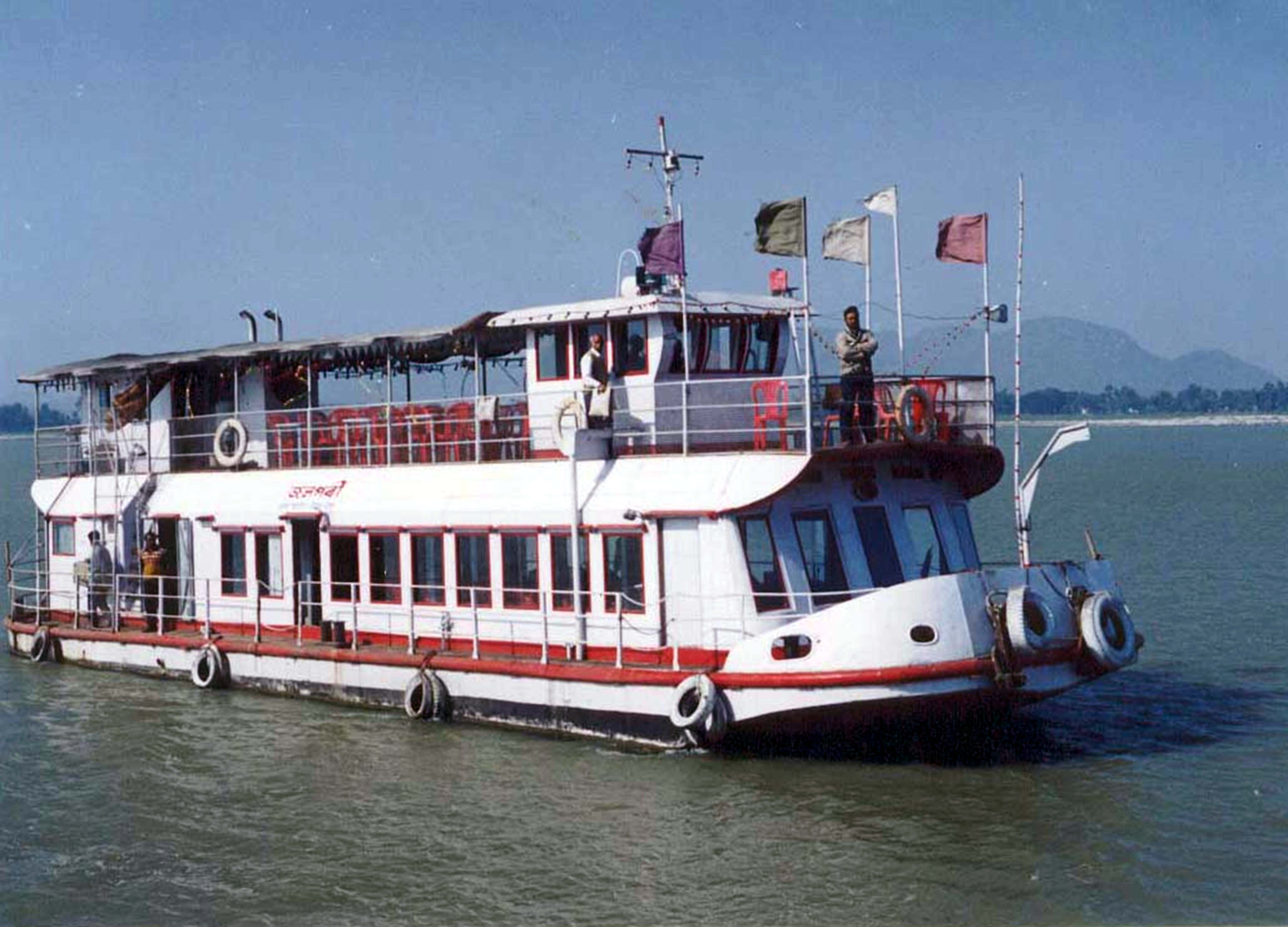
River cruise ship on the Brahmaputra River

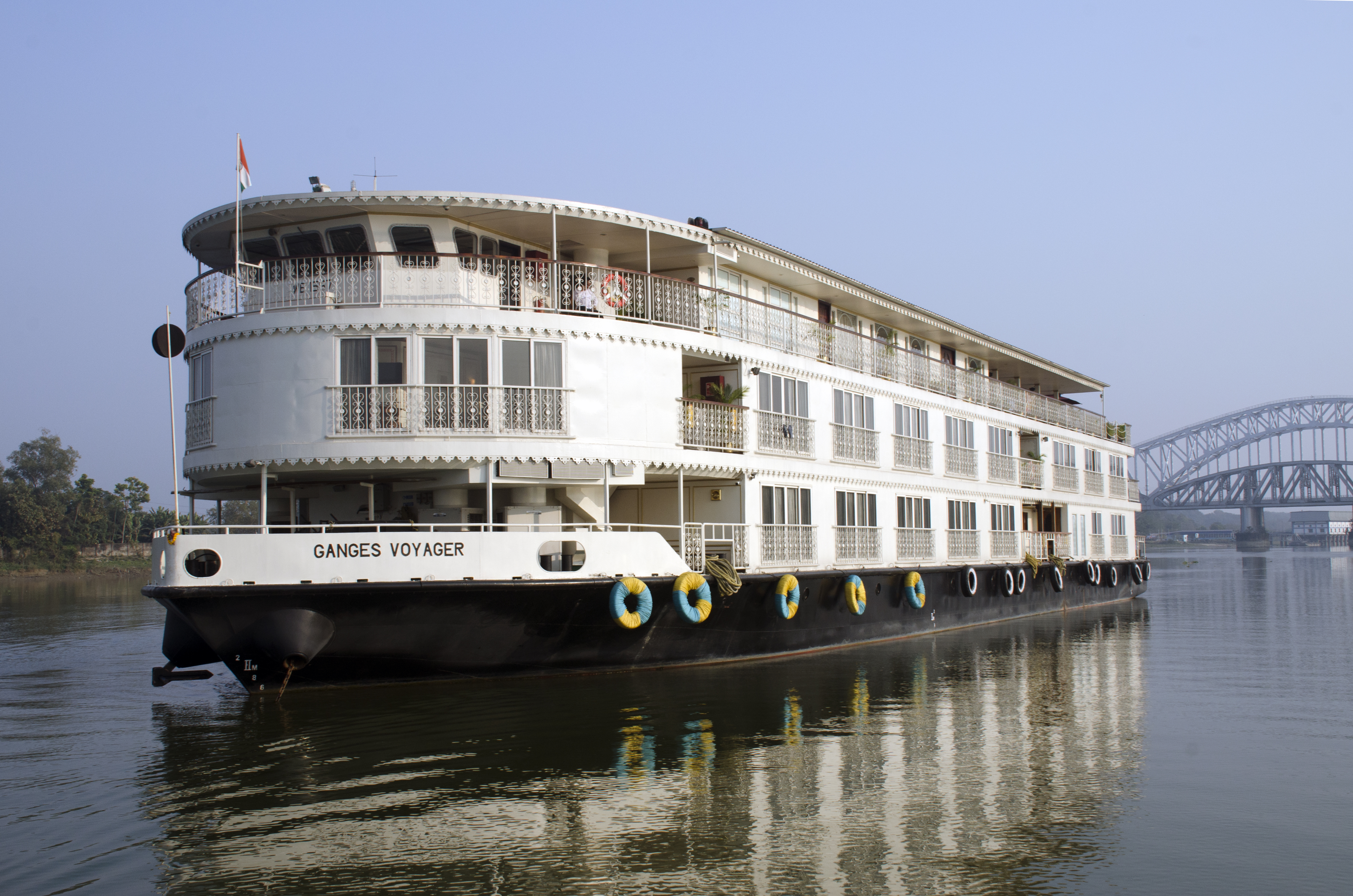
Ganges Voyger Cruise Ship near Hooghly Imambara

A river cruise is a voyage along inland waterways, often stopping at multiple ports along the way. Since cities and towns often grew up around rivers, river cruise ships frequently dock in the center of cities and towns.

== Descriptions ==
=== River day cruises ===
River day cruises are day excursions ranging from 30 minutes to a full day. They can be on boats carrying as few as 10 people or as many as a few hundred. Such a cruise is typically based in a city with a river flowing through the centre (e.g., Amsterdam, Bangkok, London, Paris, Varanasi) or an area of natural beauty, such as on the Hudson River, Rhine, Thames and Ganga. Popular locations include:

- Africa: Luxor, Cairo
- Americas: New York City, New Orleans, San Antonio, St. Louis. Detroit
- Asia: Bangkok, Ho Chi Minh City, Kuching, Malacca, Singapore, Varanasi
- Europe: Amsterdam, Budapest, Cologne, London, Paris

=== River cruises ===
River cruise ships with accommodation facilities offer longer cruises.

According to Douglas Ward, "A river cruise represents life in the slow lane, sailing along at a gentle pace, soaking up the scenery, with plentiful opportunities to explore riverside towns and cities en route. It is a supremely calming experience, an antidote to the pressures of life in a fast-paced world, in surroundings that are comfortable without being fussy or pretentious, with good food and enjoyable company."

River cruising is a major tourist industry in many parts of the world.

- Africa: Nile
- Americas: Mississippi, Columbia River, Snake River, Hudson River, St. John's River, Tolomato River, Potomac River, Intracoastal Waterway, Inside Passage, Puget Sound, Sacramento River, Napa River, San Joaquin River, Peruvian Amazon.
- Asia: Brahmaputra, Ganga, Hooghly, Padma, Damodar, Irrawaddy, Mekong, Yangtze.
- Australia: Murray
- Europe: Danube, Rhine, Seine, Rhone, Volga, Moselle, Main, Douro.

== See also ==
- List of river films and television series
