= Club Med 2 =

Computer-controlled staysail schooner

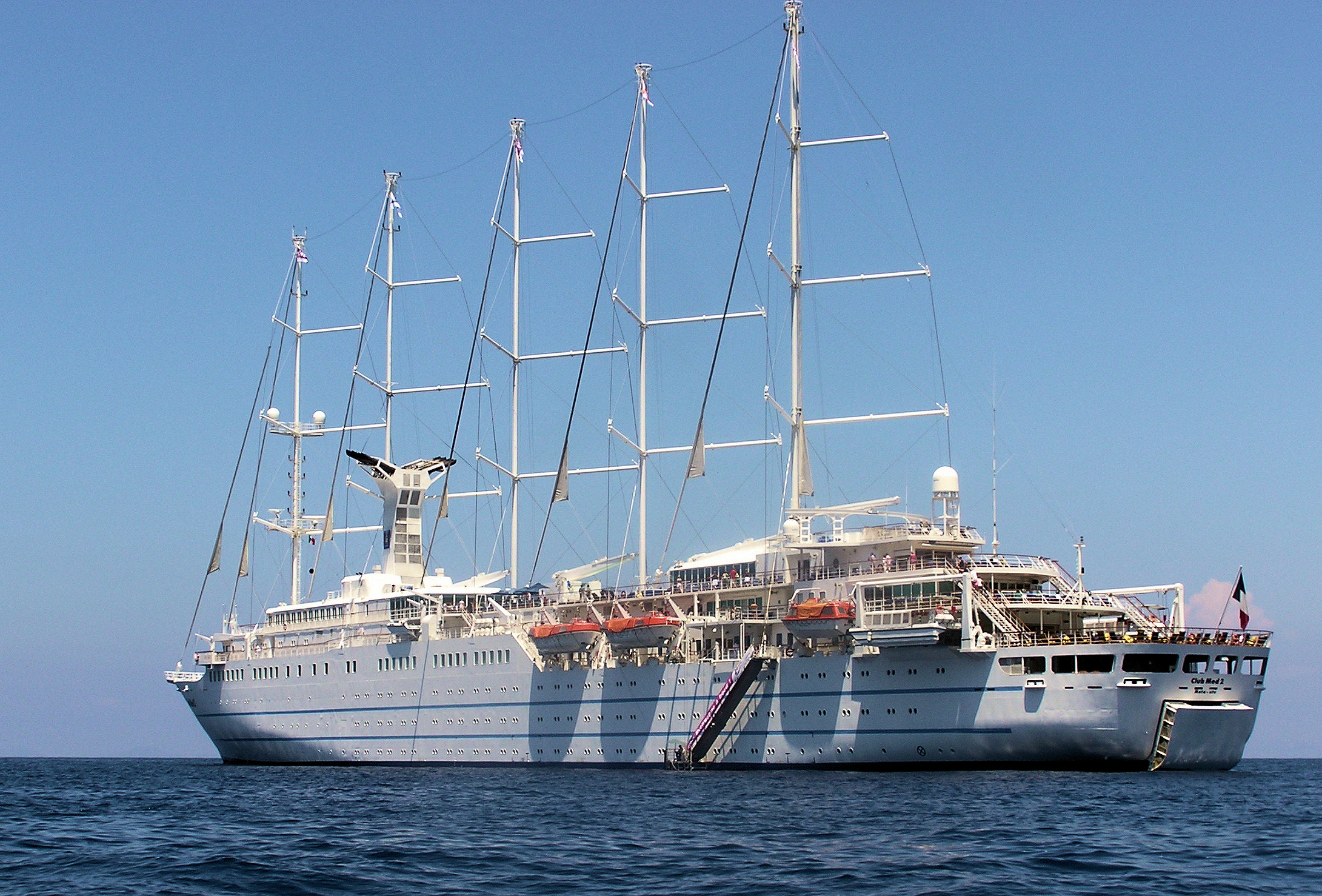
- Club Med 2 in the harbour of Capri

History

Wallis and Futuna
- Name: Club Med 2
- Owner: Club Med
- Port of registry: Mata-Utu
- Route: Winter in Caribbean, summer in Mediterranean
- Ordered: 1992
- Yard number: 1567
- Way number: 1674
- Laid down: Le Havre, France 1992 by Société nouvelle des ateliers et chantiers du Havre
- Completed: 1996
- Maiden voyage: 1996
- Identification: Call sign: FNIR; IMO number: 9007491; MMSI number: 227194000
- Status: In service

General characteristics
- Tonnage: 14,983 GT; 1,674 DWT
- Length: 194 m (636 ft)
- Beam: 20 m (66 ft)
- Height: 80 m (262 ft)
- Draught: 5.09 m (17 ft)
- Decks: 8
- Deck clearance: 20 ft (6.1 m)
- Installed power: Two diesel-electric engines and computer-operated sails
- Sail plan: Staysail schooner, ca. 26,000 sq ft (2,400 m^{2}) in seven triangular Dacron self-furled sails on five masts
- Speed: 10–15 knots (19–28 km/h; 12–17 mph)
- Capacity: 386 passengers
- Crew: 214

Club Med 2 is a five-masted computer-controlled staysail schooner owned and operated by Club Med and operated as a cruise ship. It combines the power of seven computer-operated sails with more traditional diesel-electric power, having four diesel generators that power two electric motors. Club Med 2 was launched in 1992 in Le Havre, France. Her sister ship Club Med 1 was sold to Windstar Cruises and renamed Wind Surf in 1998.

The ship, one of the largest sailing cruise ships in the world, carrying up to 386 passengers with a crew of 214, sails the waters of the Mediterranean, Aegean Sea and Adriatic Sea in the summertime and the Caribbean in the winter, finding her way into anchorages larger cruise ships cannot reach. Transatlantic voyages are offered in the spring (eastbound) and fall (westbound).

The ship provides ballroom dancing, bridge and music, and sails at night making a stop each morning. A water sports deck can be deployed from the stern.

== History ==
The ship was based on Windstar Cruises' smaller 5,350-ton, 148-passenger Wind Star, Wind Spirit and Wind Song motor sailing yachts. All were built by Société Nouvelle des Ateliers et Chantiers du Havre, France.

== See also ==
- List of large sailing vessels
