= Wind Surf =

Five-mast staysail schooner

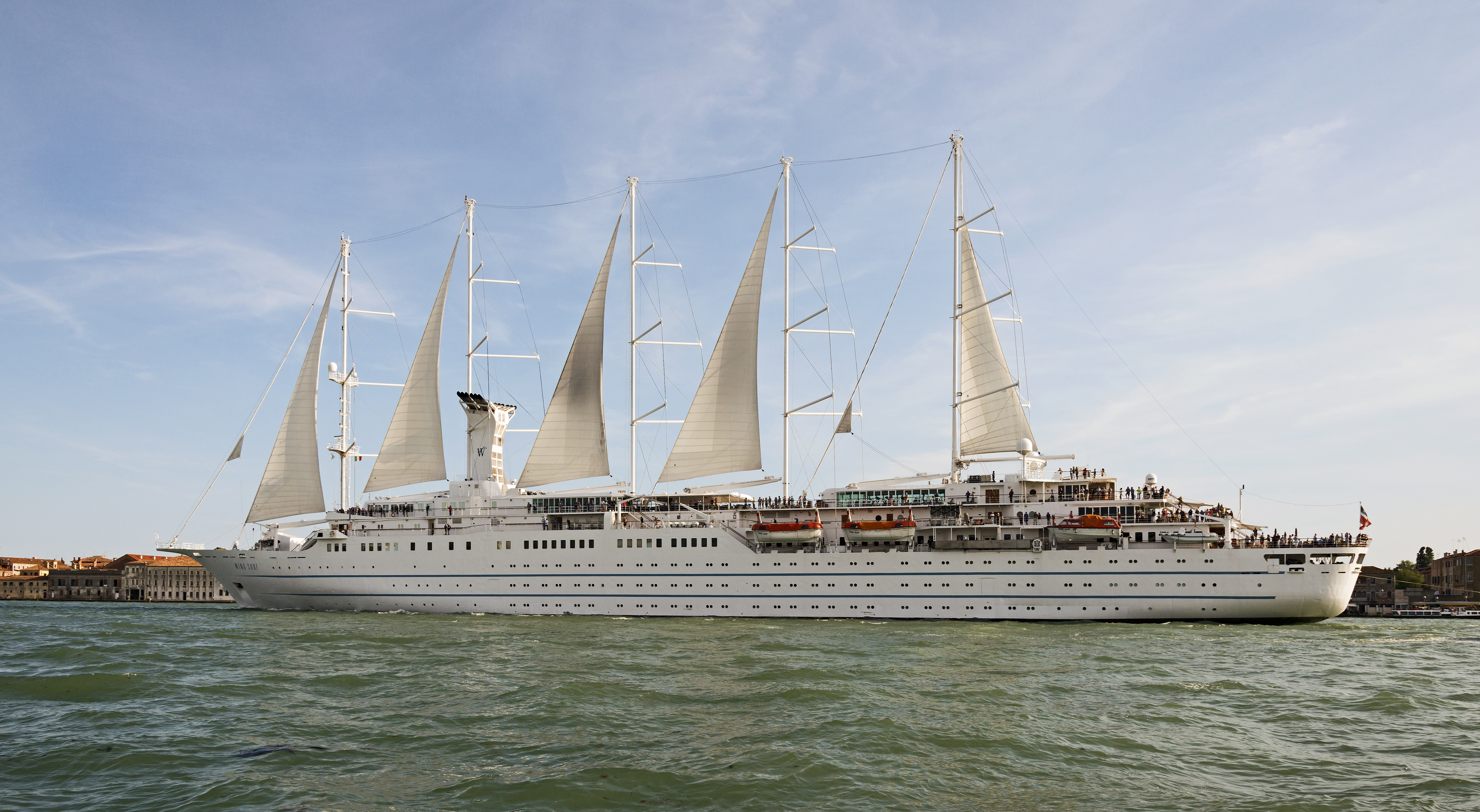
- Wind Surf leaving Venice

History
- Name: 1989–1990: La Fayette; 1990–1998: Club Med 1; 1998 onwards: Wind Surf
- Owner: Windstar Cruises
- Operator: 1990–1998: Club Med; 1998 onwards: Windstar Cruises
- Port of registry: 1989–1990: Le Havre, France; 1990–1998: Mata-Utu (Wallis & Futuna Islands), France; 1998–2006: Nassau, Bahamas; 2006–2007: Rotterdam, Netherlands; 2007 onwards: Nassau, Bahamas
- Ordered: 1986
- Builder: Societe Nouvelle Des Ateliers et Chantier du Havre
- Yard number: 274
- Laid down: Ateliers et Chantiers du Havre, France 1988 by Société nouvelle des ateliers et chantiers du Havre
- Launched: January 1989
- Completed: 27 December 1989
- Maiden voyage: 1990
- Identification: Call sign: C6IO6; IMO number: 8700785; MMSI number: 309242000
- Status: In service

General characteristics
- Type: Cruise ship
- Tonnage: 14,745 GT; 1,654 DWT
- Length: 187 m (614 ft)
- Beam: 20 m (66 ft)
- Height: 80 m (262 ft)
- Draught: 5.09 m (17 ft)
- Decks: 8
- Deck clearance: 6.1 m (20 ft)
- Installed power: Four diesel-electric engines, and wind
- Propulsion: Computer-operated sails, and two electric motors
- Sail plan: Staysail schooner, ca. 2,400 m^{2} (26,000 sq ft) in seven triangular Dacron self-furled sails on five masts
- Speed: Engines: 12 knots (22 km/h; 14 mph); engines with wind assistance: 15 knots (28 km/h; 17 mph)
- Capacity: 386 passengers
- Crew: 214

MSY Wind Surf is a five-mast staysail schooner that is one of the largest sailing cruise ships in the world, with two electric propulsion motors powered by four diesel electric generating sets also. She can carry up to 342 passengers, in a total of 150 ocean-view staterooms, 18 ocean-view suites and 2 deluxe bridge suites, with a crew of 210. Wind Surf had been owned and operated by Club Med under the name Club Med 1, and was later transferred to Windstar Cruises.

== History ==
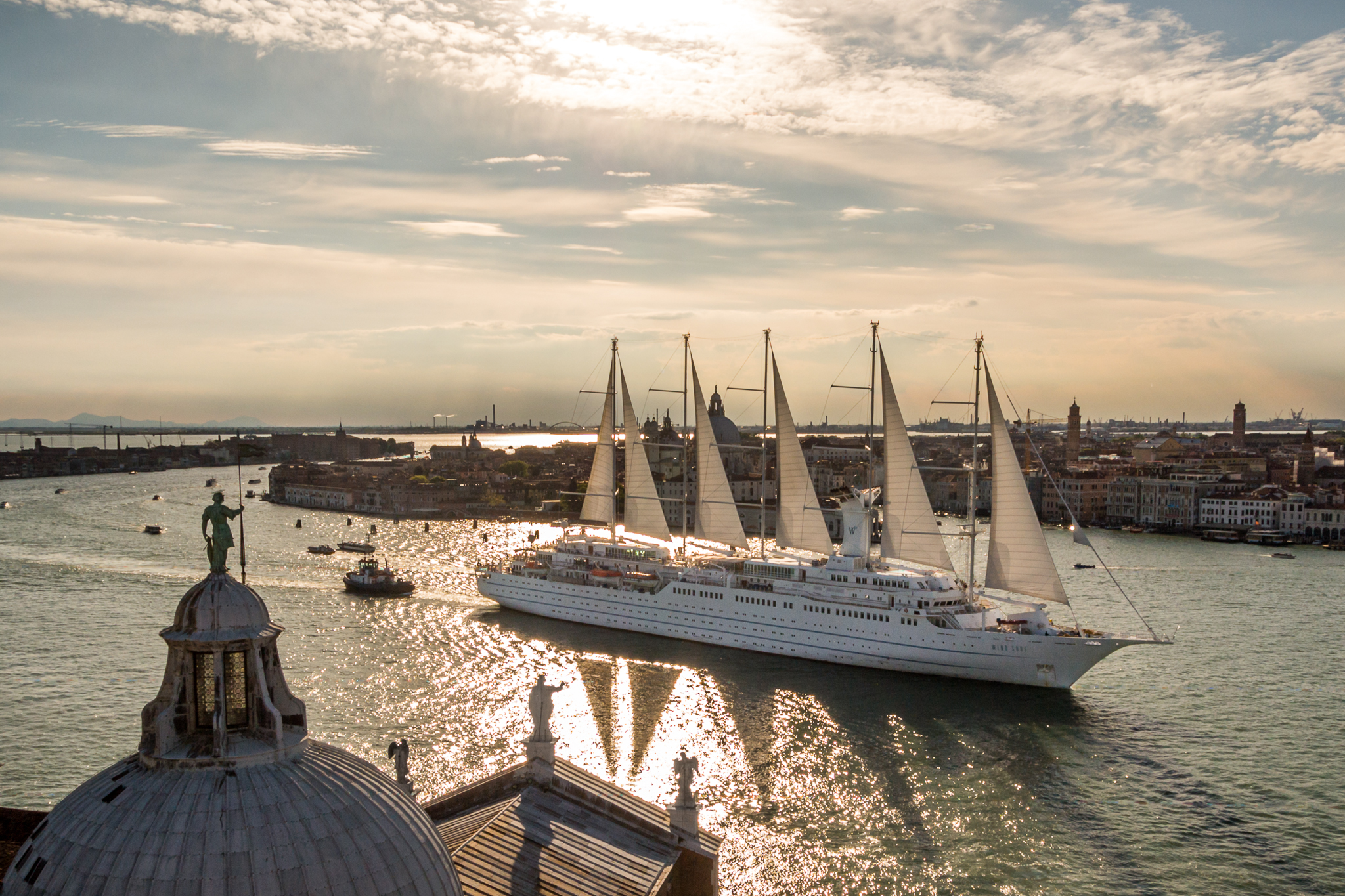
MSY Wind Surf cruise sailing along the coast of Venice, from the bell tower of San Giorgio Maggiore (13/05/2019)

La Fayette was launched in 1989 at the Société Nouvelle des Ateliers et Chantiers du Havre, France, renamed Club Med 1 on 14 January 1990. Her sister ship Club Med 2 was launched in 1992 in the same shipyard. Club Med 1 made her maiden voyage in 1990, and sailed for Club Med for eight years.

In 1998, Club Med 1 was sold to Windstar Cruises and renamed Wind Surf. The ship was based on Windstar Cruises' smaller 5,350-ton, 148-passenger Wind Star, Wind Spirit and Wind Song motor sailing yachts. All were also built by Société Nouvelle des Ateliers et Chantiers du Havre, France. In 2013, she was featured in the season 7, episode 3, of a Discovery TV series, called Mighty Ships.

== See also ==
- List of large sailing vessels
