= List of stretched cruise ships =

Cruise lines have opted to increase capacity by stretching their current ships. Also known as lengthening and jumboization, the process of enlarging a cruise ship usually includes cutting the ship in half and adding a new midsection, adding more cabins and public areas. The first modern cruise ship to be stretched was Royal Caribbean Line's Song of Norway in 1977.

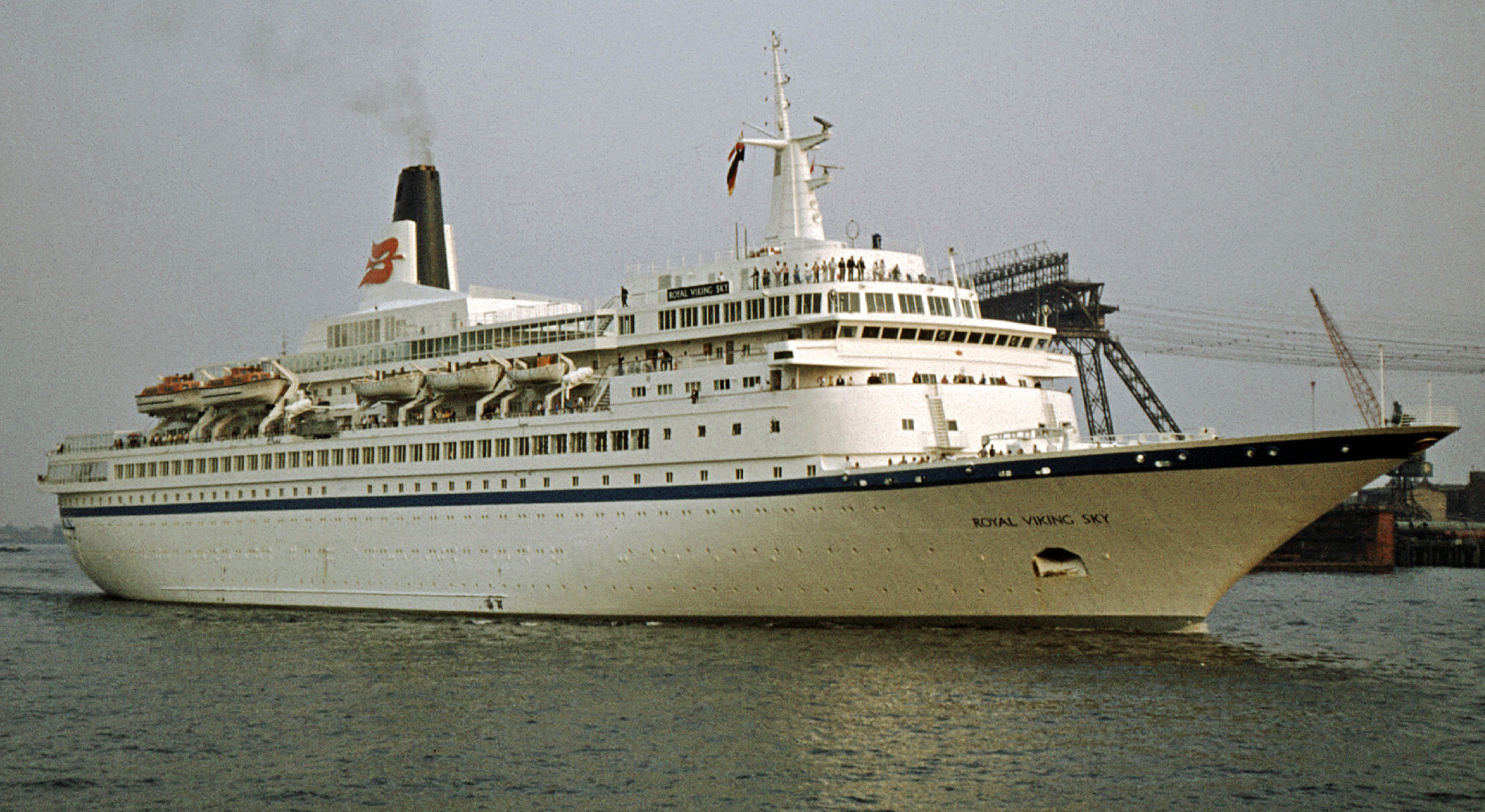
Royal Viking Sky Before Stretch

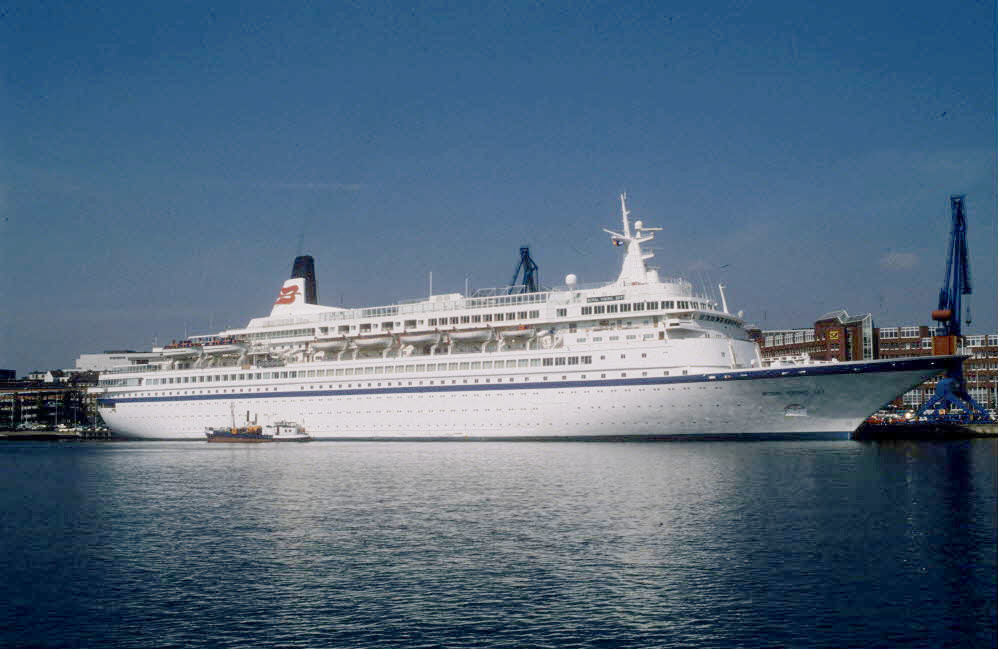
Royal Viking Sky After Stretch

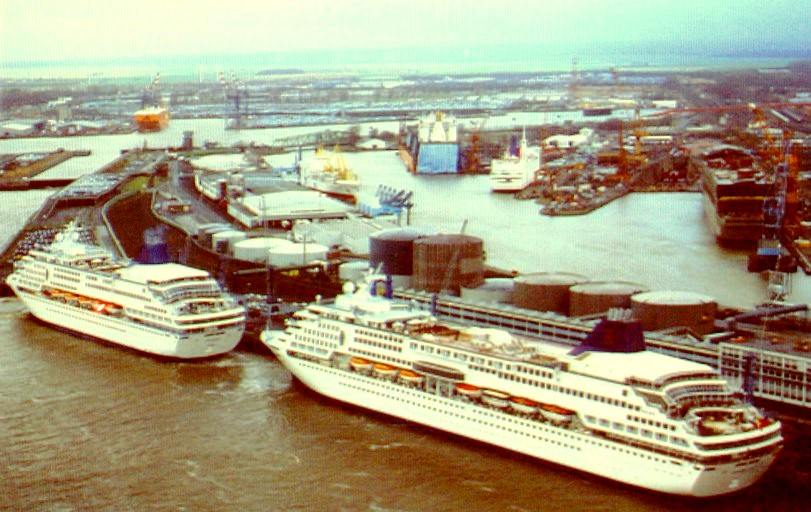
Norwegian Wind & Norwegian Dream Before and After Stretch

Ship Name	Cruise Line	Year Stretch	Length of Section	Shipyard Lengthened	Notes
Song of Norway	Royal Caribbean Cruise Line	1977	85 feet (26 m)	Wärtsilä Marine, Finland	
Nordic Prince	Royal Caribbean Cruise Line	1980	85 feet	Wärtsilä Marine, Finland	
Royal Viking Star	Royal Viking Line	1981	27.77 metres (91 ft 1 in)	A.G. Weser shipyard in Bremerhaven, West Germany	
Royal Viking Sky	Royal Viking Line	1982	27.77 metres (91 ft 1 in)	A.G. Weser shipyard in Bremerhaven, West Germany	
Royal Viking Sea	Royal Viking Line	1983	27.77 metres (91 ft 1 in)	A.G. Weser shipyard in Bremerhaven, West Germany	
Berlin		1986	17,15 metres	Nobiskrug	
Westerdam	Holland America Line	1989	36.9 m (121 ft 1 in)	Meyer Werft, Germany	
Costa Allegra	Costa Cruises	~1991	~13,4 m	T. Mariotti, Genoa	
Regent Sky	Regency Cruises	1989			The ship was never completed and later scrapped.
Sally Albatross	EffJohn International	1992	13 meters		The Sally Albatross was rebuilt in 1992 using the hull of the old Sally Albatros which was damaged by a fire. Hull extendet about 13 Meters.
Norwegian Dream	Norwegian Cruise Line	1998	40-metre (131 ft 3 in)	Lloyd Werft shipyard in Bremerhaven, Germany.	
Norwegian Wind	Norwegian Cruise Line	1998	40-metre (131 ft 3 in)	Lloyd Werft shipyard in Bremerhaven, Germany.	
Norwegian Majesty	Norwegian Cruise Line	1999	33.76 m (110 ft 9 in)	Lloyd Werft shipyard in Bremerhaven, Germany.	
Costa Classica	Costa Cruises	2000 (CANCELLED)	146 feet (45 m) (intended)	Cammell Laird Birkenhead shipyard, United Kingdom	New midsection constructed, job was cancelled when ship was en route to shipyard Would have been largest lengthening of a cruise ship.
Pride of America	NCL America	2004	70 feet (21 m)	Lloyd Werft shipyard in Bremerhaven, Germany.	Stretched while under construction at Lloyd Werft shipyard.
Enchantment of the Seas	Royal Caribbean International	2005	22 m (73-ft)	Keppel Verolme shipyards in Rotterdam	
Balmoral	Fred Olsen Cruises	2007	30 m (98 ft)	Blohm + Voss shipyard in Hamburg, Germany	
Braemar	Fred Olsen Cruises	2009	102 feet (31 m)	Blohm + Voss shipyard in Hamburg, Germany	
MSC Armonia	MSC Cruises	2015	24 metres (79 ft)	Fincantieri Shipyard, Palmero, Italy	
MSC Sinfonia	MSC Cruises	2015	24 metres (79 ft)	Fincantieri Shipyard, Palmero, Italy	
MSC Lirica	MSC Cruises	2015	24 metres (79 ft)	Fincantieri Shipyard, Palmero, Italy	
MSC Opera	MSC Cruises	2015	24 metres (79 ft)	Fincantieri Shipyard, Palmero, Italy	
Silver Spirit	Silversea Cruises	2018	49 feet (15 m)	Fincantieri Shipyard, Palmero, Italy	
Star Breeze	Windstar Cruises	2020	25.6-meter	Fincantieri Shipyard, Palmero, Italy	
Star Legend	Windstar Cruises	2021	25.6-meter	Fincantieri Shipyard, Palmero, Italy	
Star Pride	Windstar Cruises	2021	25.6-meter	Fincantieri Shipyard, Palmero, Italy	
MSC Magnifica	MSC Cruises	2021 (CANCELLED)	23-meter		The stretching of the ship was announced for 2021, but never done.
