= Star Pride =

Cruise ship

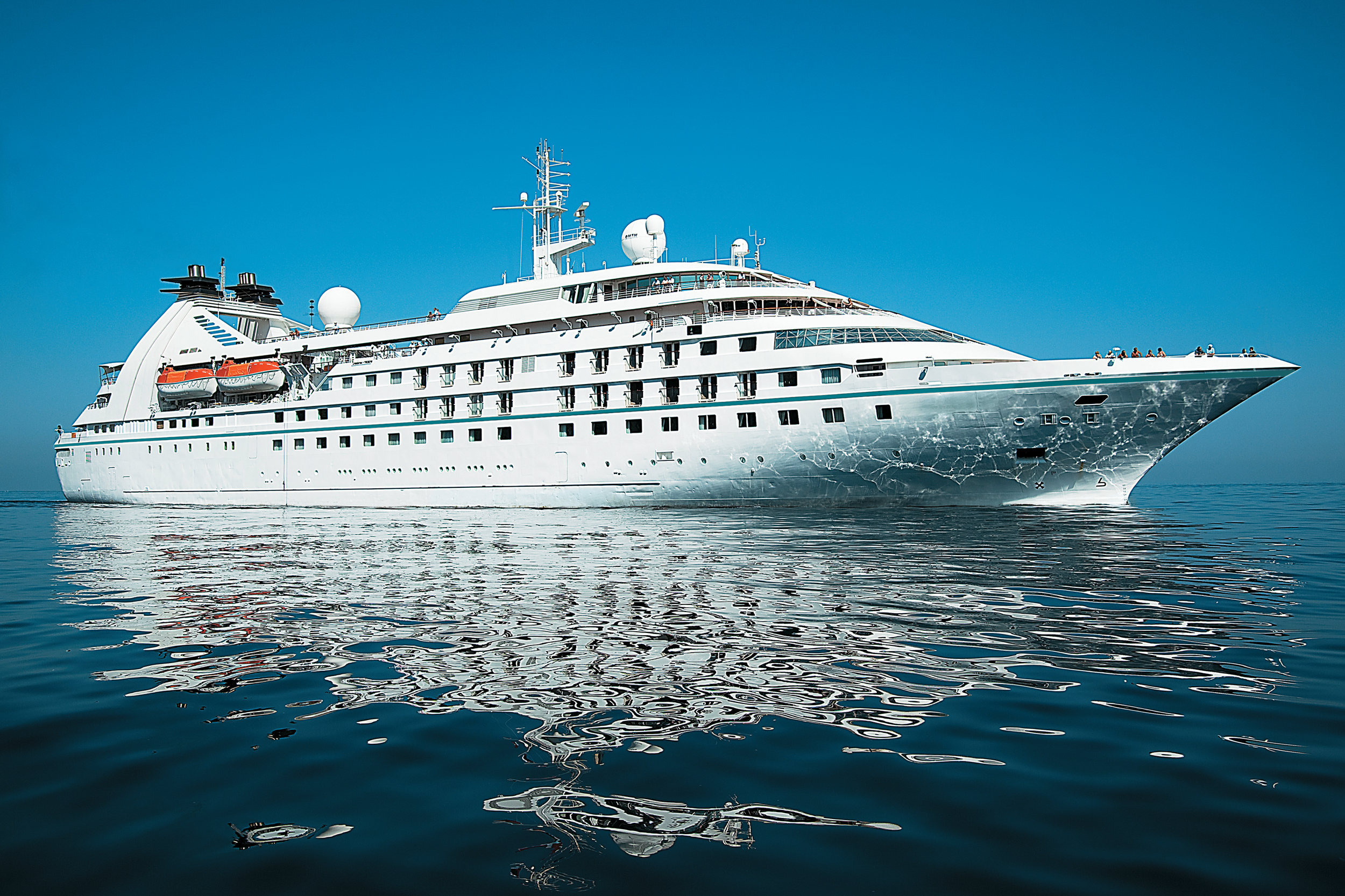
- Star Pride in 2016

History
- Name: 1988-2014: Seabourn Pride; 2014–present: Star Pride
- Owner: 1988-2014: Seabourn Cruise Line Limited; 2014–present: Windstar Cruises
- Operator: 1988-2014: Seabourn Cruise Line; Windstar Cruises 2014–present
- Port of registry: 1988–2001: Oslo, Norway; 2001–present: Nassau, Bahamas
- Builder: Schichau-Seebeckwerft
- Yard number: 1065
- Laid down: 1 December 1987
- Launched: 22 July 1988
- Christened: Shirley Temple Black
- Completed: 18 November 1988
- Acquired: 1988
- In service: 1988
- Identification: Call sign: C6FR5; IMO number: 8707343; MMSI number: 311084000
- Status: In Service

General characteristics
- Class & type: Pride-Class Ships
- Tonnage: 12,995 GT
- Length: 522 ft (159 meters)
- Beam: 63 ft (19 meters)
- Draught: 17.7 ft (5.4 meters)
- Decks: 5 passenger
- Installed power: 7,280 kW
- Propulsion: Twin propeller, driven by two Wartsila diesel engines
- Speed: 19.2 knots (35.6 km/h; 22.1 mph) (maximum); 15 knots (28 km/h; 17 mph) (service)
- Capacity: 312 guests
- Crew: 188-190 international staff

Star Pride (formerly Seabourn Pride) was the first of three German built cruise ships that were initially built for the Seabourn Cruise Line. She was known as Seabourn Pride and is now operated for Windstar Cruises and was the first of her class.

== History ==
=== Seabourn Cruise Line ===
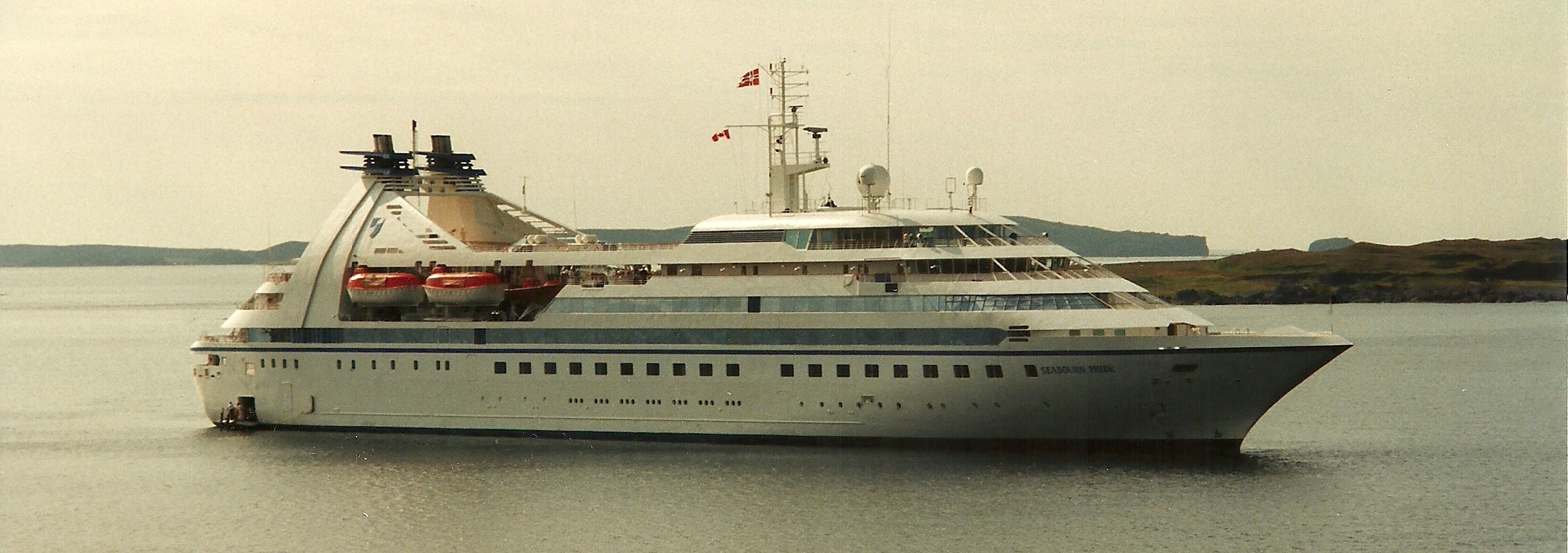
Seabourn Pride in original livery

The ship was originally intended to be launched as the Signet Pride, following the cruise lines original name of Signet Cruise Line, but was changed to Seabourn Pride after objections over trademark ownership by Signet Oil. Seabourn Pride set out on her maiden voyage in November 1988 as Seabourn Pride, after being christened by Shirley Temple Black. The maiden voyage was a 15-day maiden cruise through the Panama Canal to San Francisco.

The ship had many unique innovative features when built including a top-deck observation lounge for viewing the sky at night, and Nautilus Room in the hull for illuminated underwater viewing of marine life. An aft stern door had a bay for two custom built tenders and a marina platform that allowed passengers to swim, ski, sail, snorkel and enjoy other water sports.

Seabourn Pride at Quay in Bergen on August 1, 2009.

After sister ship Seabourn Spirit was attacked by pirates off the coast of Somalia, in November 2005, Seabourn Pride was fitted with a Long Range Acoustic Device (LRAD), designed as a non-lethal method to fend off attackers. During 2007, she was refurbished along with the other two vessels owned by Seabourn Cruise Line, to keep up with the luxurious image of Seabourn Cruise Line. This included the addition of French balconies to the two upper stateroom decks.

In 2006, a Forbes.com article declared Seabourn Pride's New Year cruise as the most expensive in its category.

In 2013 it was announced that Seabourn Pride was sold to Windstar Cruises (along with her two sisters). Seabourn Cruise Line would remain her operator until the transfer was completed in May 2014 after her farewell season.

=== Windstar Cruises ===
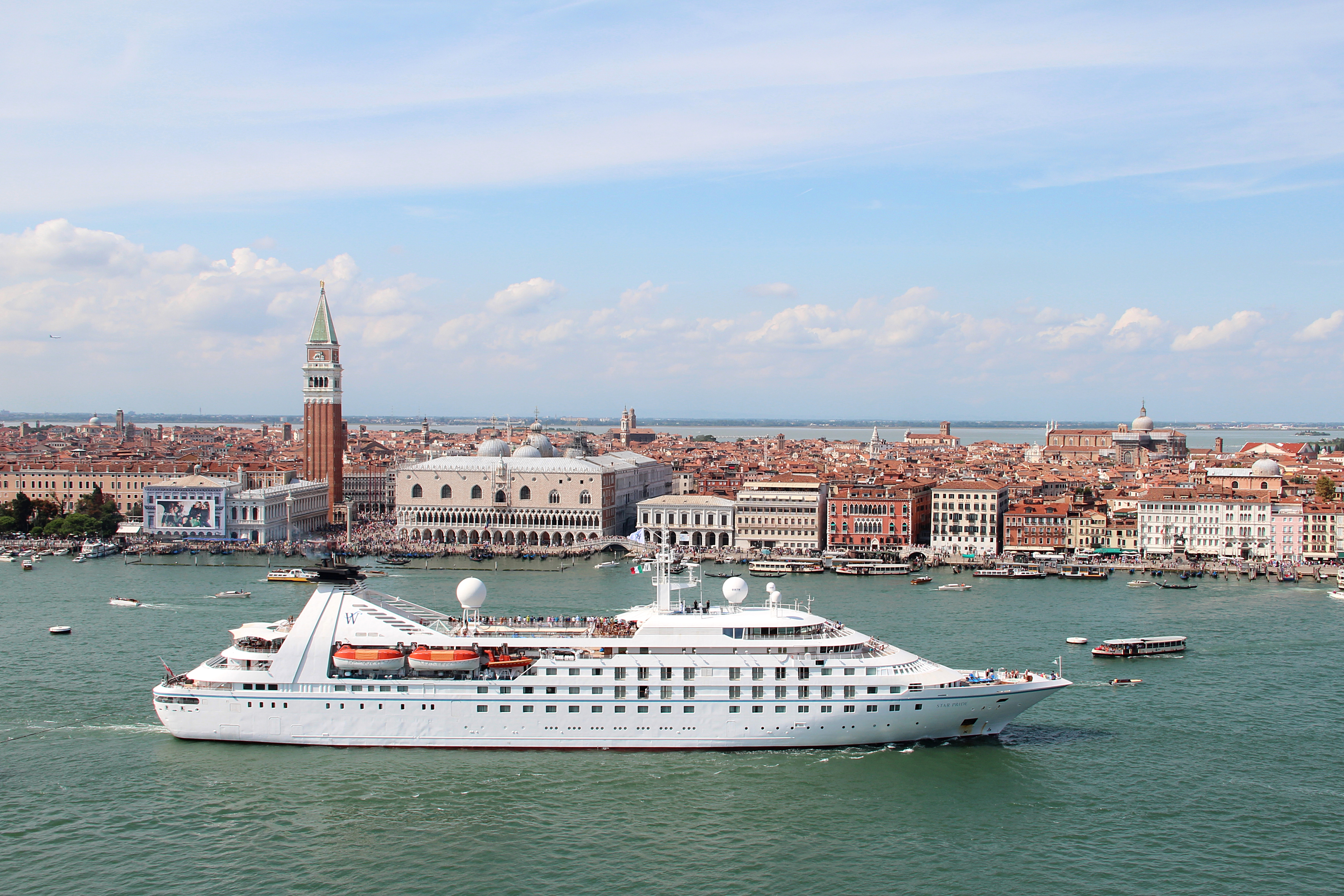
Star Pride sailing in the Bacino di San Marco in Venice (Italy).

Renamed Star Pride, the ship entered service for Windstar Cruises on May 5, 2014. She was rechristened by Mrs. Nancy Anschutz, wife of Mr. Philip Anschutz, owner of Xanterra Parks & Resorts, Windstar's parent company.

On December 22, 2015, Star Pride hit a reef near the pacific coast of Panama. The passengers and crew were stranded for over 15 hours on Coiba, a Panamanian island and national park. The passengers were rescued by another Windstar boat, the Star Breeze, and Paul Gauguin Cruise's ship, the Tere Moana. She was salvaged and put back into service on June 9, 2016.

In 2016, the ship was refurbished, with interior finish updates, and expanded verandah cafe seating leading to the removal and infill of the original swimming pool. The top outdoor deck was expanded by four feet on each side, giving additional space for deck chairs. The Star Deck also had a new counter-current pool and whirlpool installed, replacing the two previous whirlpools, and the card room was transformed to a screening room.

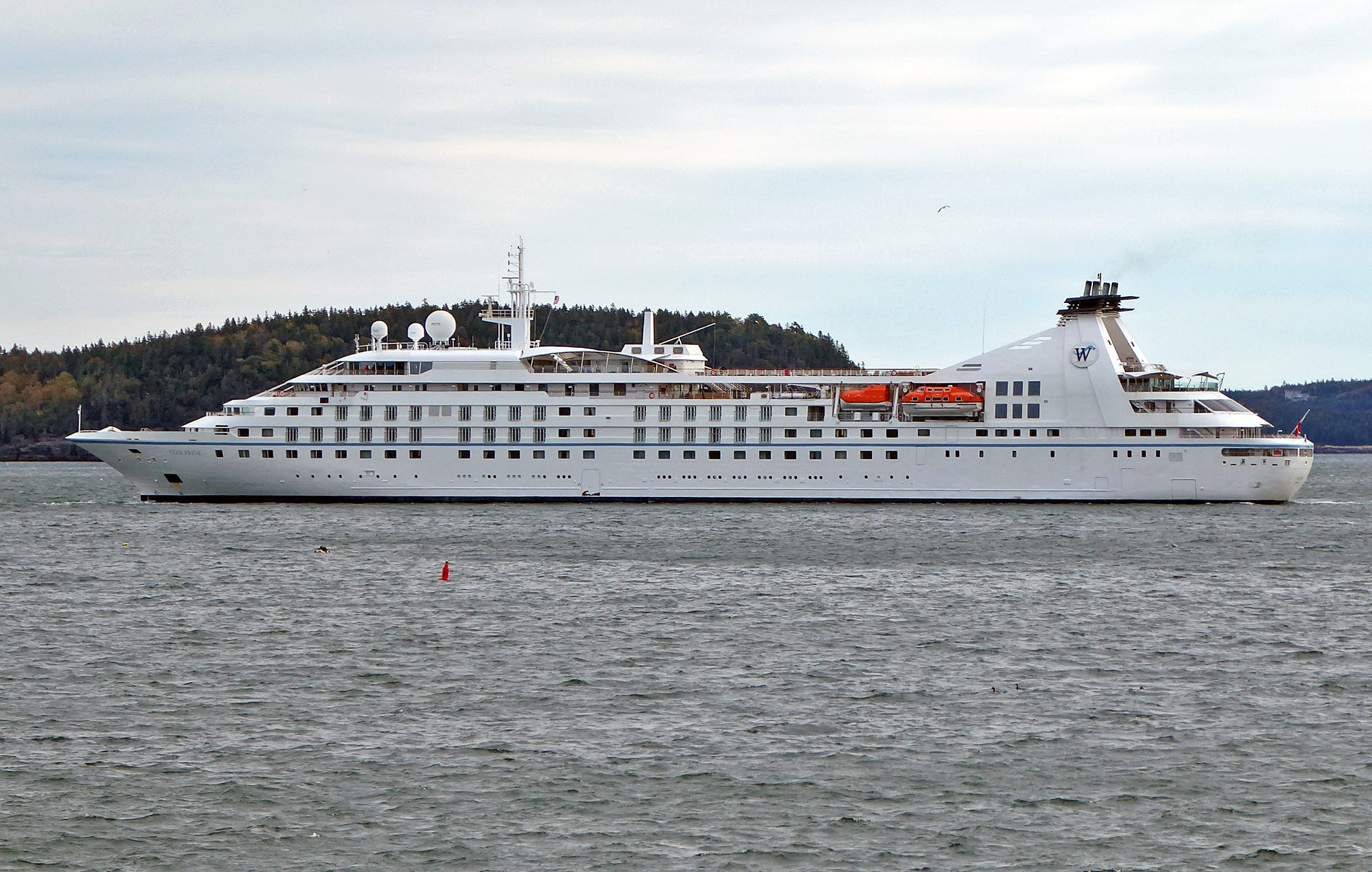
Lengthened Star Pride 2022

On 7 September 2018, Star Pride lost power while in Buzzards Bay between Woods Hole and Martha's Vineyard off Massachusetts, United States. The ship anchored, and regained power after several hours. Commercial tugboats went to its aid. The US Coast Guard sent a helicopter from Coast Guard Air Station Cape Cod, to police a security zone around the ship. Star Pride later sailed to Newport, Rhode Island for inspection, and was then cleared to sail to New York, to disembark passengers and prepare for its next voyage. The ship had experienced a loss of cooling water for the engine systems, causing an automatic shutdown of the propulsion and auxiliary engines.

==== Stretching ====
In 2018, as part of Star Plus initiative, it was announced that Windstar would stretch(25.6-meter midsection), renovate and re-engine its three Star-class ships: Star Breeze, Star Legend and Star Pride. Ray Chung, director of design for The Johnson Studio at Cooper Carry in New York, was hired to design new suites and public spaces. New public areas, including two new dining venues, a new spa, infinity pool, 50 cabins and fitness area were added, with the ship's capacity increasing from 208 passengers to 312. The ship also had its seven engines removed and replaced with four new environmentally friendly engines. The original custom built gantry tenders were removed from the aft waters-sports bay and donated to Maritime University Scalda in the Netherlands, with new standard tenders placed at the life boat location. The stretching was conducted at Fincantieri’s shipyard in Palermo, Sicily, Italy, and completed in October 2021.
