= Windstar =

Windstar may be:

- Ford Windstar, a minivan
- Windstar Cruises, a cruise line
  - Wind Star (ship), one of Windstar's sailing vessels
- Windstar Foundation, an environmental education organization founded by John Denver and Thomas Crum
- Windstar Records, a record label founded by John Denver
- Windstar turbine, a vertical axis wind turbine
- Zero Gravity Windstar, a South Korean paraglider design
