= Winstar =

Winstar may refer to:

- Winstar Communications
- WinStar Farm
- WinStar World Casino
- Margaret Winstar (floruit 1590-1600), Danish courtier

== See also ==
- Windstar (disambiguation)
