= Club Med =

French travel and tourism operator

Club Med SAS
- Type: Subsidiary
- Industry: Tourism
- Founded: 27 April 1950; 76 years ago
- Headquarters: Paris, France
- Key people: Stéphane Maquaire, President; Michel Wolfovski, Deputy CEO and CFO; Patrick Calvet, Vice President Villages Europe-Africa; Gino Andreeta, CEO President Villages Europe-Africa; Quentin Briard; Carolyne Doyon, CEO North America
- Products: Travel; Tourism
- Revenue: €2.090 billion (2024)
- Number of employees: 20,333
- Parent: Fosun International
- Website: www.clubmed.us

Club Med SAS, commonly known as Club Med and previously known as Club Méditerranée SA, is a French travel and tourism operator headquartered in Paris, specializing in all-inclusive holidays. Founded in 1950, the company has been primarily owned by the Chinese conglomerate Fosun Group since 2013. Club Med either wholly owns or operates nearly eighty all-inclusive resort villages in holiday locations around the world.

== History ==
=== Foundation ===
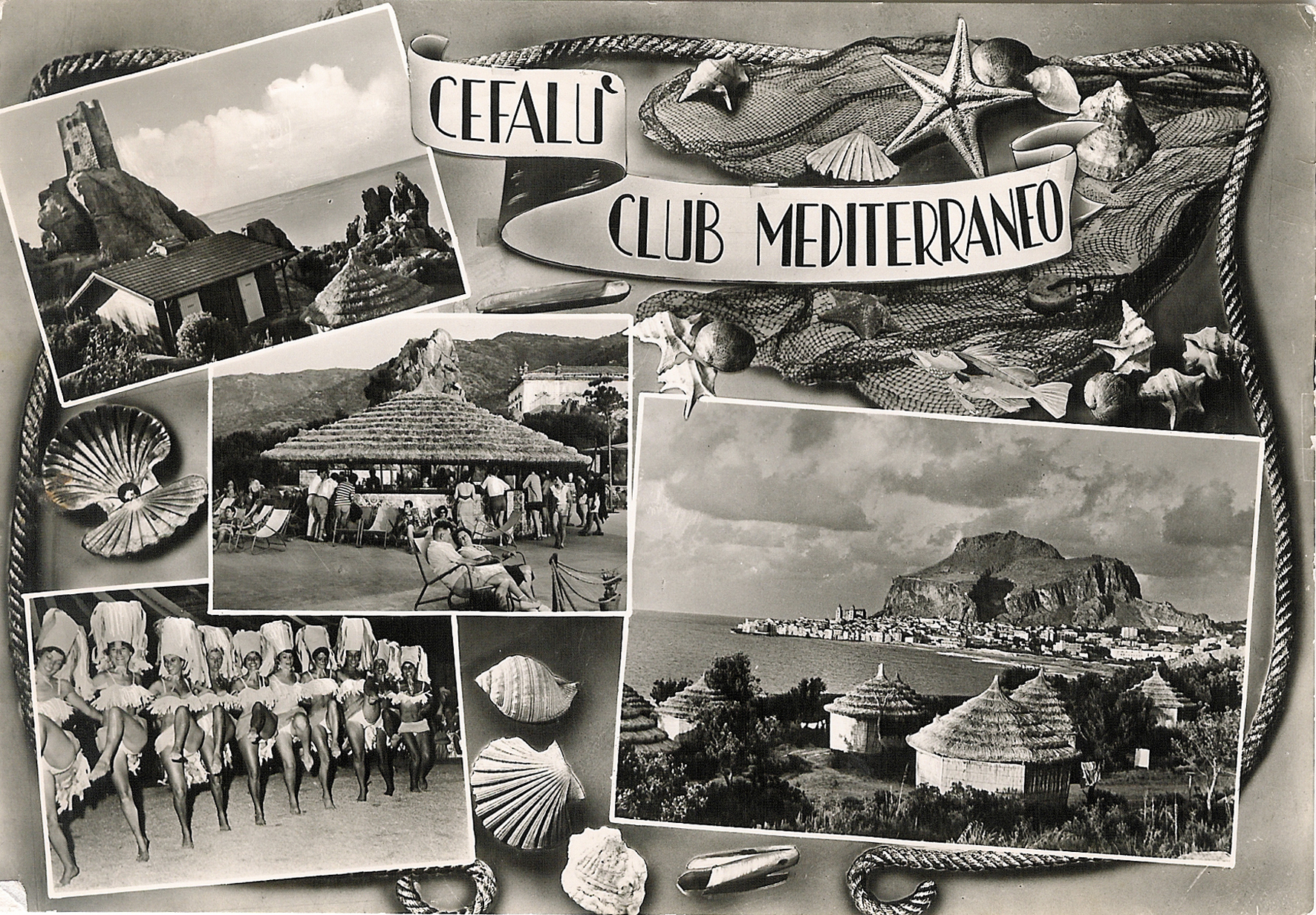
Postcard of the village of Club Med Cefalù (1961)

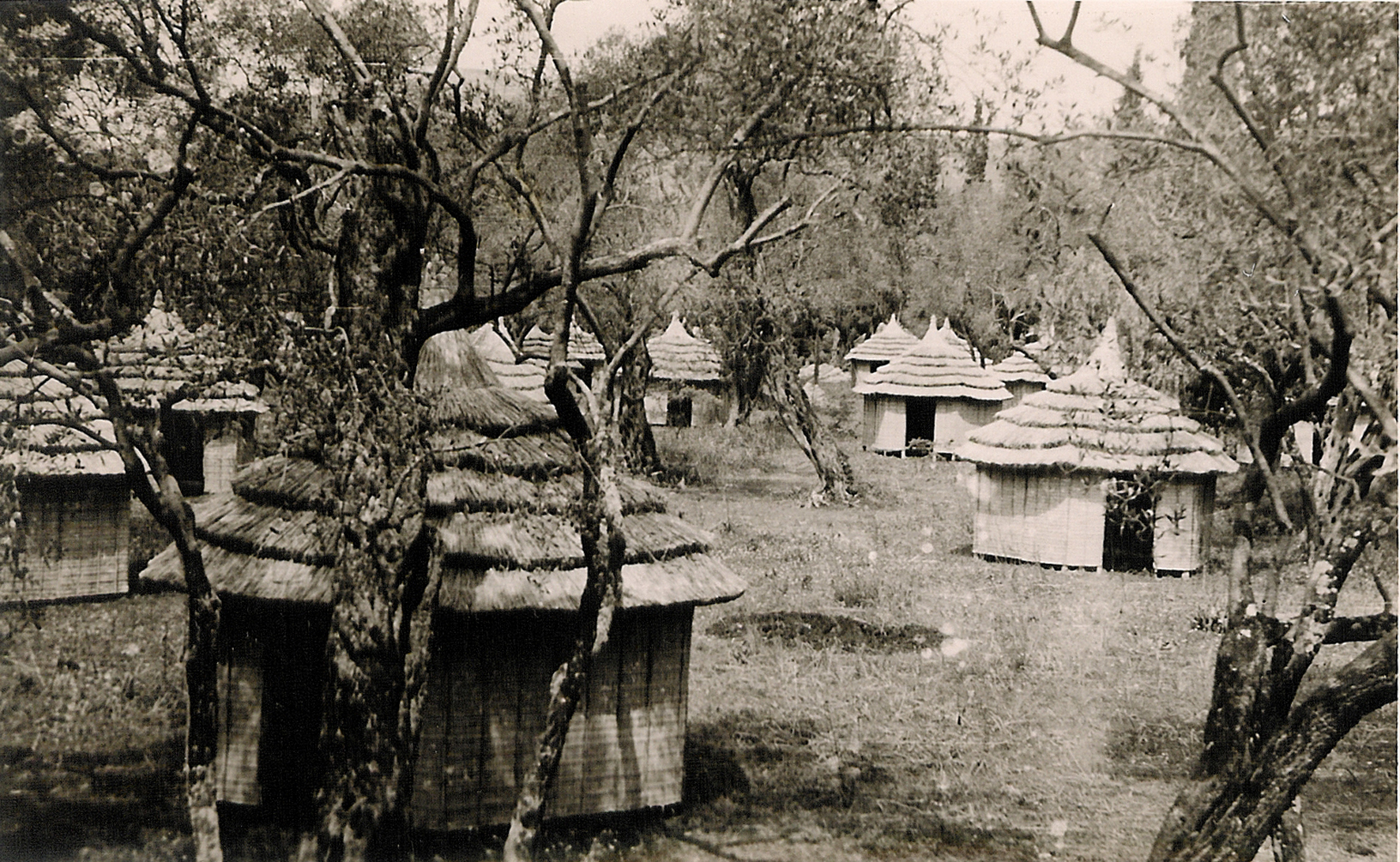
Village of Club Med Corfu in beach of Dassia, Corfu (1960)

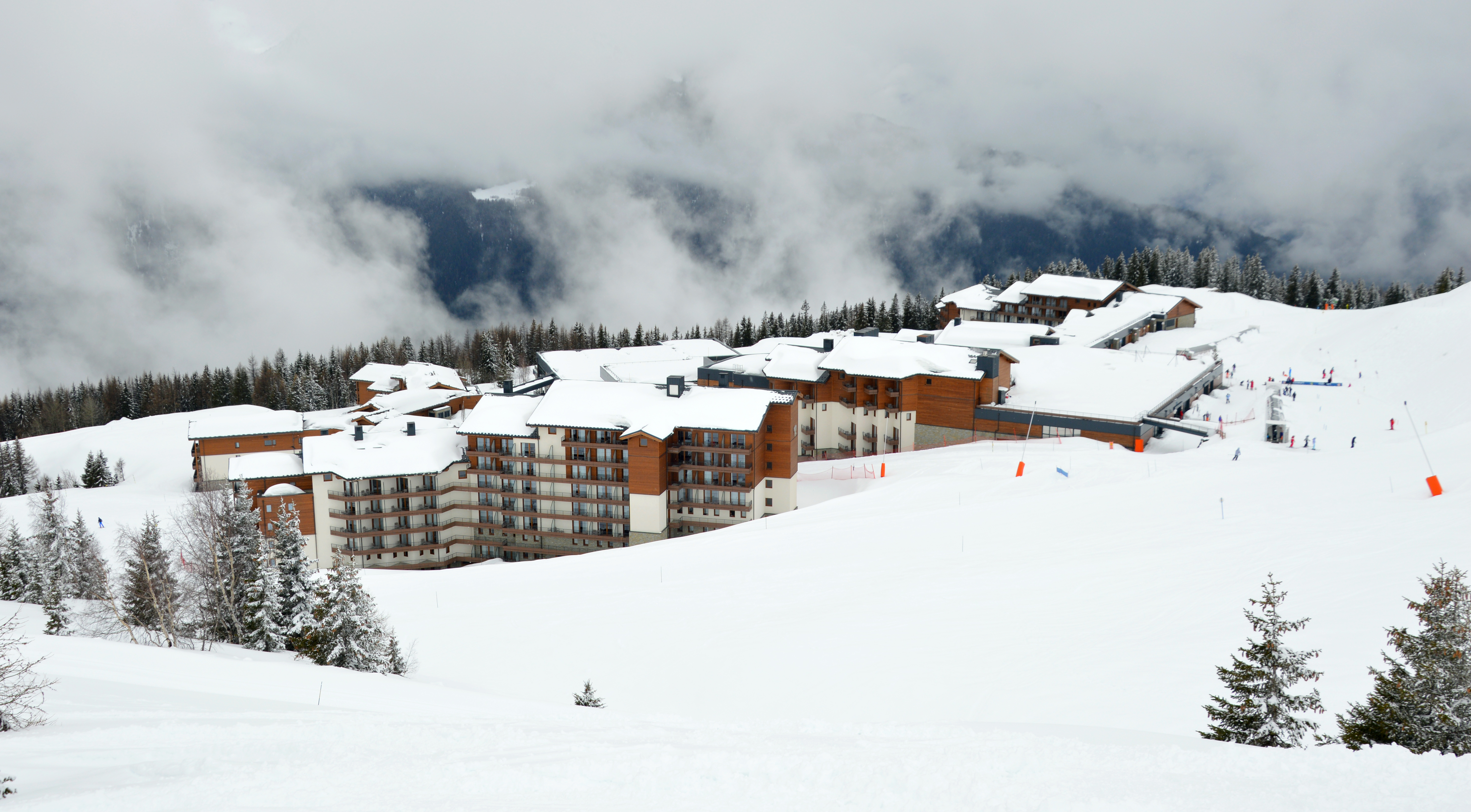
Club Med, La Rosière, 2024

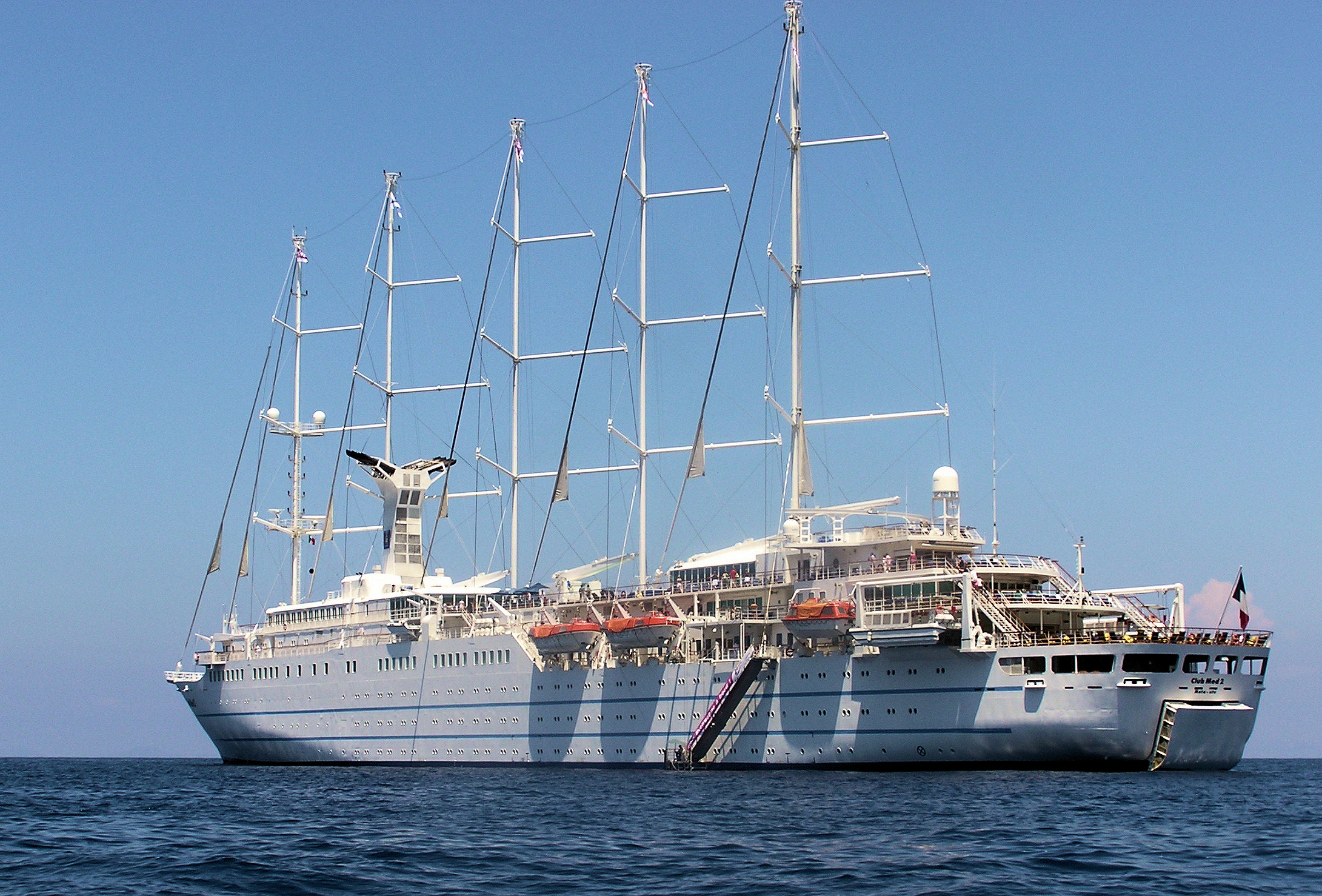
Club Med 2, launched in 1992 in Le Havre, France. It is a 5-mast cruise ship with sails automatically deployed by computer control. She is now cruising the Mediterranean, Caribbean and Atlantic

The club was founded in 1950 by Belgian entrepreneur Gérard Blitz. Blitz had opened a low-priced summer colony of tents on the Spanish island of Mallorca, followed by another on the island of Djerba (Tunisia). A better entertainer than businessman, Blitz went bankrupt in 1953. His main creditor was his tent supplier Gilbert Trigano, the French "King of Camping"; Trigano took control of the club and slowly pushed Blitz aside. The first official Club Med was built the next year in Palinuro, Salerno, Italy. The original villages were simple: members stayed in unlit straw huts on a beachfront, sharing communal washing facilities. Such villages have been replaced with modern blocks or huts with ensuite facilities.

=== Expansion ===
Because of reckless spending, the club was on the verge of bankruptcy in 1961. It was saved by the 35-year-old Baron Edmond de Rothschild after he had visited a resort and enjoyed his stay. With Rothschild financing, the number of villages increased greatly under Trigano's leadership from 1963 to 1993. Winter villages, providing skiing and winter sports tuition, were introduced in 1956 at Leysin, Switzerland. In 1965, the first club outside the Mediterranean was opened in Tahiti. Club Med broadened its reach by opening villages in the French Caribbean (Guadeloupe and Martinique). Originally attracting mainly singles and young couples, the club later became primarily a destination for families, with the first Mini Club opening in 1967.

Club Méditerranée S.A. had a branch in the USA named Club Méditerranée Inc, with several partners including Crédit Lyonnais and American Express. In 1974, upon his arrival as the new CEO of the club for North America, Jean Lallement, one of the first members of the club and responsible for its large presence in Italy, hired as marketing manager the French HEC Jacques Bacon, who made the club a huge success within 3 years through an aggressive and very efficient promotion; it was he who suggested the name Club Med. The new name was at that time reserved to the North American market, but later became the name of the mother company as well.

In the early 1970s the club had bought from its owner Claude Lelouche the famous revolutionary three-mast sailing boat Vendredi 13, installed 4 berths and a bath-room, and based it at the Buccaneer's Creek village in Martinique for one to several days cruises. This turn out to be a big success. As a result, in 1976, the club acquired the big sailing boat built by solo sailor Alain Colas, who had just lost the Solo Transatlantic Race Plymouth-Newport to Eric Tabarly. The boat was renamed Club Méditerranée and based in Martinique for 2-3-day cruises. Another success, so, the club built a second one, a monster named Club Med 2. The club has also ceased to be a club in the legal sense, changing from a not-for-profit association to a for-profit public limited company (French SA) in 1995. However, each new customer is still charged a membership fee upon joining, and returning customers are charged an annual fee as well.

=== Diversification ===
In the 1990s, the club's fortunes declined as competitors copied its concepts and holidaymakers demanded more sophisticated offerings. Management was also criticised for overbuilding, selecting unsuitable locations and understaffing. In 1997, the shareholders dismissed the Triganos and replaced them with Philippe Bourguignon, former CEO of Novotel USA. Bourguignon aimed to change the club "from a holiday village company to a services company". The club took over a chain of French gyms, launched bar/restaurant complexes known as Club Med World in Paris and Montreal, and commenced a budget resort concept aimed at young adults. Oyyo was the first such resort, opened at Monastir in Tunisia. Thirteen new villages were planned for the new century.

=== Relaunch ===
The change in strategy was not successful, and the club fell into a deep loss following the 11 September 2001 attacks in the U.S. In 2002, a new CEO, Henri Giscard d'Estaing, son of the former French President, was appointed. His strategy was to refocus on the holiday villages and attract upmarket vacationers. Club Med World Montreal and many villages, particularly those in North America or with more basic facilities, were closed. The club returned to profitability in 2005.

In 2004, the hotel group Accor became the largest shareholder, but it sold most of its stake in 2006, announcing that it wished to refocus on its core businesses. From 2001 onward, the resort company worked to rebrand itself as upscale and family-oriented.

In 2006 and 2007, Club Med and its partners dedicated a total of $530 million to renovate several resorts.

=== Acquisition ===
In February 2015, Fosun International Ltd.'s Gaillon Invest II and The Silverfern Group finalized a takeover deal of Club Méditerranée S.A. The acquisition culminated a bidding war that began in May 2013, which was conducted by Gaillon, a special investment vehicle used by Fosun, to execute its bidding for Club Med. The two-year-long war boosted the price of the company from the initial €541 million "friendly bid" in 2013 up to the final sale price of €939 million ($1.07 billion). Gaillon Invest's chairman, Jiannong Qian, believes that Chinese ownership of the company is crucial to tap into China's huge population of potential tourists. Following the takeover, Chairman and President of Club Méditerranée SA, Henri Giscard d'Estaing, was named President of Club Med SAS.

== Properties ==
This is the list of current and future Club Med properties:

Europe & Mediterranean

Europe & Mediterranean
No.	Name	Location	Country
1	La Palmyre Atlantique	Les Mathes	France
2	Opio en Provence	Opio, Alpes-Maritimes	France
3	Vittel Ermitage	Vittel	France
4	Gregolimano	Euboea	Greece
5	Cefalù	Sicily	Italy
6	Da Balaia	Praia da Balaia	Portugal
7	Magna Marbella	Marbella	Spain
8	Bodrum Palmiye	Bodrum	Turkey
9	Palmiye	Kemer	Turkey
10	Palmiye Hotel	Kemer	Turkey

Asia & Indian Ocean

Asia & Indian Ocean
No.	Name	Location	Country
1	Beidahu (Winter & Summer)	Beidahu, Jilin	China
2	Changbaishan (Winter & Summer)	Changbai Mountains	China
3	Guilin	Guilin	China
4	Lijiang	Lijiang	China
5	Yabuli (Winter)	Yabuli Ski Resort	China
6	Bali	Badung Regency	Indonesia
7	Bintan	Bintan Island	Indonesia
8	Manado (Future Opening)	North Minahasa Regency	Indonesia
9	Kabira Ishigaki	Ishigaki Island	Japan
10	Kiroro Grand (Winter)	Hokkaido Island	Japan
11	Kiroro Peak (Winter & Summer)	Hokkaido Island	Japan
12	Sahoro Hokkaido (Winter)	Hokkaido Island	Japan
13	Tomamu Hokkaido (Winter & Summer)	Hokkaido Island	Japan
14	Borneo (Future Opening)	Kuala Penyu, Sabah	Malaysia
15	Cherating Beach	Cherating	Malaysia
16	Kani	Kaafu Atoll	Maldives
17	The Finolhu Villas	Gasfinolhu Island	Maldives
18	Albion	Albion	Mauritius
19	La Pointe aux Canonniers	Grand Baie	Mauritius
20	The Albion Villas	Albion	Mauritius
21	Musandam (Future Opening)	Musandam Governorate	Oman
22	Seychelles	Sainte Anne Island	Seychelles
23	Koh Samui (Future Opening)	Ko Samui	Thailand
24	Phuket	Phuket Province	Thailand

The Alps

The Alps
No.	Name	Location	Country
1	Alpe d'Huez (Winter & Summer)	Alpe d'Huez	France
2	Grand Massif Samoëns Morillon (Winter & Summer)	Samoëns	France
3	La Plagne 2100	Aime-la-Plagne	France
4	La Rosière (Winter & Summer)	Montvalezan	France
5	Les Arcs Panorama (Winter & Summer)	Bourg-Saint-Maurice	France
6	Peisey-Vallandry (Winter & Summer)	Peisey-Vallandry	France
7	Serre Chevalier (Winter & Summer)	La Salle-les-Alpes	France
8	The Grand Massif Samoëns Morillon Chalet-Apartments (Winter & Summer)	Samoëns	France
9	The Valmorel Chalet-Apartments (Winter & Summer)	Valmorel	France
10	Tignes (Winter & Summer)	Tignes	France
11	Val d'Isère (Winter & Summer)	Val-d'Isère	France
12	Val Thorens Sensations	Les Belleville	France
13	Valmorel (Winter & Summer)	Les Avanchers-Valmorel	France
14	Pragelato Sestriere (Winter & Summer)	Turin	Italy
15	Saint-Moritz Roi Soleil	St. Moritz	Switzerland

Africa

Africa
No.	Name	Location	Country
1	Marrakech La Palmeraie	Marrakesh	Morocco
2	Yasmina	Martil	Morocco
3	Cap Skirring	Kabrousse	Senegal
4	Club Med South Africa	Tinley Manor Beach	South Africa
5	Club Med Safari Lodge	Tinley Manor Beach	South Africa
6	Djerba La Douce	Midoun	Tunisia

Canada

Canada
No.	Name	Location	Country
1	Quebec Charlevoix (Winter & Summer)	Petite-Rivière-Saint-François	Canada

Caribbean

Caribbean
No.	Name	Location	Country
1	Columbus Isle	San Salvador Island	Bahamas
2	Michès Playa Esmeralda	Miches	Dominican Republic
3	Punta Cana	Punta Cana	Dominican Republic
4	La Caravelle	Sainte-Anne, Guadeloupe	Guadeloupe (French West Indies)
5	Les Boucaniers	Sainte-Anne, Martinique (French West Indies)	Martinique
6	Turkoise	Grace Bay	Turks and Caicos Islands

Mexico

Mexico
No.	Name	Location	Country
1	Cancún	Cancún	Mexico

Brazil

Brazil
No.	Name	Location	Country
1	Lake Paradise	Mogi das Cruzes	Brazil
2	Rio Das Pedras	Mangaratiba	Brazil
3	Trancoso	Arraial d'Ajuda	Brazil

== Ships ==
=== Current ships ===
Name	Built	Builder	Club Med service	Gross Tonnage	Flag	IMO	Notes	Image
Club Med 2	1991	Sociéte Nouvelle des Ateliers et Chantiers du Havre	1996–present	14,983 tons	Wallis and Futuna	9007491		

=== Former ships ===
Name	Built	Builder	Club Med service	Gross Tonnage	Flag	IMO	Notes	Image
Club Med 1	1989	Sociéte Nouvelle des Ateliers et Chantiers du Havre	1990–1998	14,983 tons	Wallis and Futuna	8700785	sold to Windstar Cruises & renamed Wind Surf in 1998	

== Controversies ==
The Panhellenic Federation of Employees in Hospitality and Tourism, Athens, Greece, has made serious official complaints of widespread employer misconduct, targeting Club Med Gregolimano, Euboea, Greece. Also as well the Euboea Workers' Center, Euboea, sent a letter of complaint to the competent labour Greek inspectorates authorities, conveying reports from the Employees' Association at the Club Med Gregolimano company in Euboea regarding working conditions at the Club Med Gregolimano resort. The list of complaints have been submitted at Hellenic Parliament calling for immediate action from the Ministry of Labour and Social Security. Some official complains from them are:

- Club Med Gregolimano is violating the Sectoral Collective Labour Agreement for hotel employees and Greek labour legislation.
- Problems with staff transportation by bus, with concerns raised about safety and overcrowding.
- Performing duties beyond employee's area of contracted working duties due to staff shortages.
- Inadequate air conditioning in indoor areas such as the kitchen dishwashing working space.
- Delays in employees leaving the workplace after recording their departure.
- Shortcomings in changing room infrastructure.
- Issues with agency contracting companies that employ staff, such as non-payment of final payroll, incomplete registration of social security subscriptions, failure to provide contracts, and salary remuneration lower than that provided by Greek collective labour agreements, and others.

== In popular culture ==
In Jean-Luc Godard's La Chinoise (1967), the character Guillaume (Jean-Pierre Léaud) talks about his father who had fought Germans in the war, now ran Club Med resort working along the lines of concentration camps.

The phrase "Club Med- a cheap holiday in other people's misery" appeared as a Situationist slogan, written in graffiti in Paris, May 1968. The phrase was described as a commentary on alienation, domination, and "the false promises of modern life". The slogan was later given a nod to in the opening lyrics of the Sex Pistols song "Holidays in the Sun".

The Club Med style of vacation was satirized in the 1978 film, Les bronzés (released in English as French Fried Vacation) directed by Patrice Leconte. Sequels Les Bronzés font du ski and Les Bronzés – Amis pour la Vie were released in 1979 and 2006 respectively.

The 1983 film Copper Mountain: A Club Med Experience, starring Jim Carrey and Alan Thicke, is a quasi-commercial for the now-closed Club Med village in the U.S. ski resort at Copper Mountain, Colorado.

On the 1985 album Telephone Free Landslide Victory by the band Camper Van Beethoven is the song "Club Med Sucks"

The 1986 ABC TV movie Club Med stars Jack Scalia and Linda Hamilton as a Club Med manager and guest, respectively, who fall in love.

In 2004, a Korean TV drama broadcast by MBC titled First Love of a Royal Prince was filmed in Club Med Bali, Sahoro, and Bora Bora. In the drama, the main actress, Sung Yu-ri, played Kim Yu Bin, a GO.

Within the United States, minimum security prisons can be referred to as Club Fed.

In 2004, the American comedy team Broken Lizard released a comedy slasher film named Club Dread. In the movie, a paradise resort for young people full of sex, drugs and rock and roll becomes the target of a deranged killer.

== See also ==
- Gérard Blitz
