= Yellowstone National Park Canyon Village Lodge =

Canyon Village Lodge at Yellowstone National Park

General information
- Type: Lodging and Resort
- Architectural style: Mid-century modern
- Location: Yellowstone National Park, Yellowstone, Wyoming, United States
- Coordinates: 44°44′6.3″N 110°29′38.5″W
- Opened: August 2015

Design and construction
- Main contractor: Xanterra Parks and Resorts

The Canyon Village Lodge at Yellowstone National Park is the largest single lodging property in Yellowstone National Park. Its renovation, first envisioned in 1988 as part of the Canyon Redevelopment Plan, is part of a larger undertaking to improve the dining and lodging prospectus park-wide.

== Construction ==
As part of a broader construction project that began in 1956, Canyon Village Lodge functioned as the primary visitor center for Yellowstone National Park for decades.

The 2016 renovation of the Lodge, in conjunction with the replacement of over four hundred guest rooms, was executed in coordination with the National Park Service and Xanterra Parks and Resorts.

The renovated Lodge, managed by Xanterra Parks and Resorts, is an extension of the Mission 66 program, which championed a mid-century modern architectural style adapted to the natural surroundings of Yellowstone National Park.

The larger upgrade project was planned to feature new dining halls, bike paths, and sustainability improvements. Construction of the new lodges was completed in 2016.

== Climate ==
Climate data for Canyon (Yellowstone), Wyoming, 1991–2020 normals, 1988-2020: 7870ft (2399m)
Month	Jan	Feb	Mar	Apr	May	Jun	Jul	Aug	Sep	Oct	Nov	Dec	Year
Record high °F (°C)	45 (7)	51 (11)	58 (14)	68 (20)	78 (26)	85 (29)	90 (32)	86 (30)	81 (27)	75 (24)	58 (14)	47 (8)	90 (32)
Mean maximum °F (°C)	37.3 (2.9)	42.3 (5.7)	51.8 (11.0)	59.9 (15.5)	68.5 (20.3)	76.7 (24.8)	81.8 (27.7)	80.8 (27.1)	75.5 (24.2)	64.1 (17.8)	47.5 (8.6)	36.6 (2.6)	82.7 (28.2)
Mean daily maximum °F (°C)	26.0 (−3.3)	30.0 (−1.1)	38.2 (3.4)	44.6 (7.0)	53.7 (12.1)	62.8 (17.1)	72.7 (22.6)	71.2 (21.8)	61.3 (16.3)	46.4 (8.0)	33.0 (0.6)	24.6 (−4.1)	47.0 (8.4)
Daily mean °F (°C)	15.3 (−9.3)	17.4 (−8.1)	25.1 (−3.8)	32.1 (0.1)	41.2 (5.1)	48.9 (9.4)	56.0 (13.3)	54.3 (12.4)	46.2 (7.9)	34.7 (1.5)	22.3 (−5.4)	14.5 (−9.7)	34.0 (1.1)
Mean daily minimum °F (°C)	4.6 (−15.2)	4.8 (−15.1)	11.9 (−11.2)	19.6 (−6.9)	28.7 (−1.8)	34.8 (1.6)	39.3 (4.1)	37.4 (3.0)	31.0 (−0.6)	22.9 (−5.1)	11.6 (−11.3)	4.5 (−15.3)	20.9 (−6.1)
Mean minimum °F (°C)	−23.7 (−30.9)	−24.8 (−31.6)	−14.3 (−25.7)	0.4 (−17.6)	14.9 (−9.5)	26.7 (−2.9)	31.8 (−0.1)	28.5 (−1.9)	20.5 (−6.4)	3.5 (−15.8)	−13.4 (−25.2)	−23.6 (−30.9)	−32.3 (−35.7)
Record low °F (°C)	−40 (−40)	−42 (−41)	−29 (−34)	−14 (−26)	−2 (−19)	22 (−6)	25 (−4)	16 (−9)	8 (−13)	−23 (−31)	−30 (−34)	−43 (−42)	−43 (−42)
Average precipitation inches (mm)	2.92 (74)	2.32 (59)	2.46 (62)	2.59 (66)	2.70 (69)	2.55 (65)	0.97 (25)	1.19 (30)	1.46 (37)	2.17 (55)	2.59 (66)	3.10 (79)	27.02 (687)
Source 1: XMACIS2
Source 2: NOAA (Precipitation)
