= Star Legend (ship) =

Cruise ship, commissioned in 1992

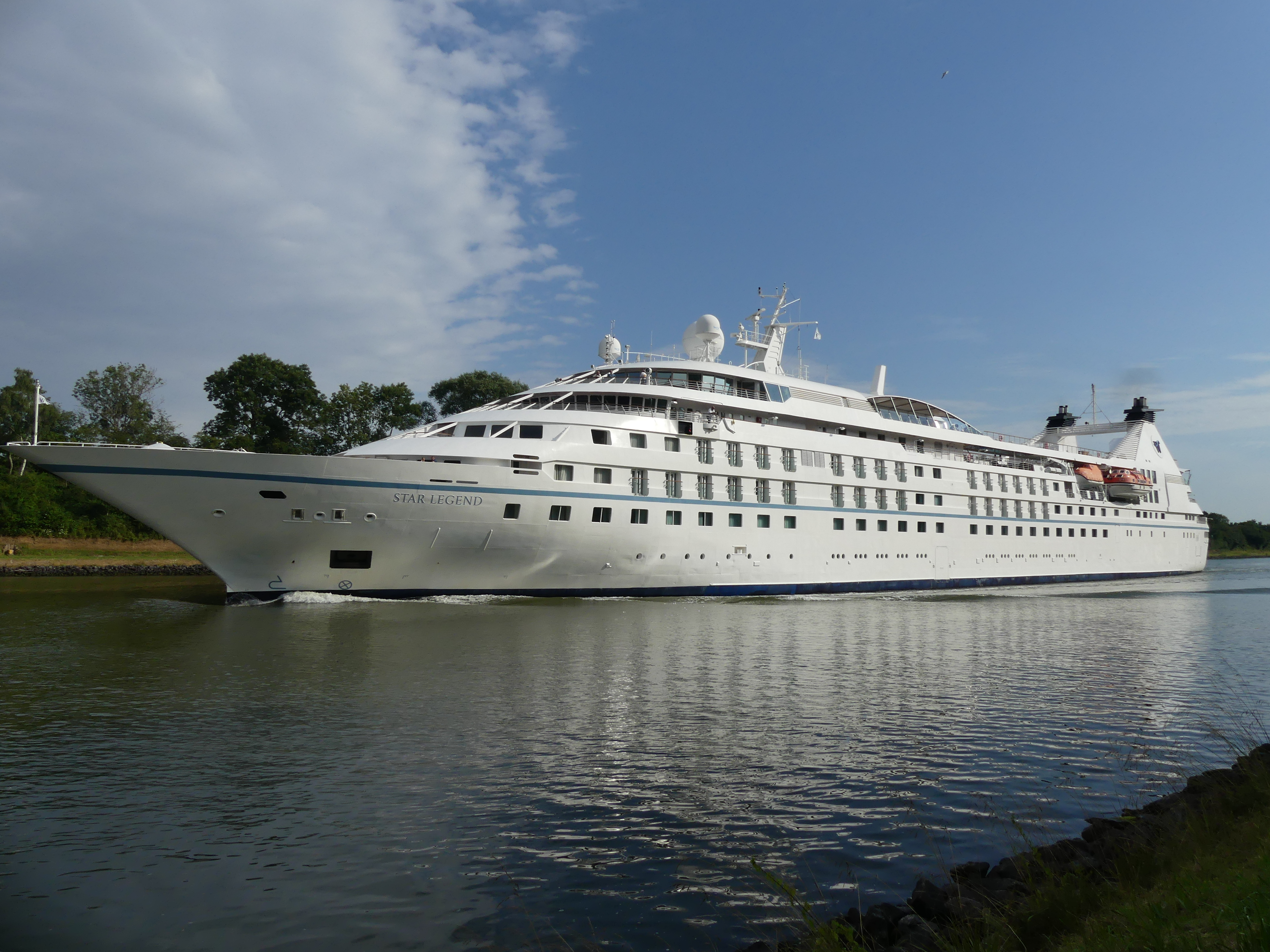
- Star Legend in the Kiel Canal, 2022

History

Bahamas
- Name: 1992-1995: Royal Viking Queen; 1995–1996: Queen Odyssey; 1996–2015: Seabourn Legend; 2015–present: Star Legend
- Operator: 1992–1995: Royal Viking Line; 1995–1996: Royal Cruise Line; 1996–2015: Seabourn Cruise Line; 2015–present: Windstar Cruises
- Port of registry: 1992–1996: Nassau, Bahamas; 1996–2001: Oslo, Norway; 2001–present: Nassau, Bahamas
- Builder: Schichau-Seebeckwerft
- Yard number: 1071
- Laid down: 26 April 1990
- Launched: May 1991
- Completed: 1 February 1992
- Commissioned: 29 February 1992 as Royal Viking Queen
- Identification: Call sign: C6FR6; IMO number: 9008598; MMSI number: 311085000
- Status: In service

General characteristics
- Tonnage: 12,995 GT
- Length: 159.6 m (523 ft 7 in) (2019), 134 m (439 ft 8 in) (as built)
- Beam: 20.50 m (67.3 ft)
- Draught: 5.415 m (17.77 ft)
- Installed power: 7280 kW
- Speed: 19.2 knots (35.6 km/h; 22.1 mph); 16 knots (30 km/h; 18 mph) (service)
- Capacity: 312 passengers (2019), 208 passengers (as built)
- Crew: 164

Star Legend (formerly Royal Viking Queen, Queen Odyssey and Seabourn Legend) is a cruise ship constructed by Schichau-Seebeckwerft in Bremerhaven, Germany and operated by Windstar Cruises.

She is the identical sister ship of Star Pride and Star Breeze, all designed by Petter Yran and Bjørn Storbraaten.

== History ==
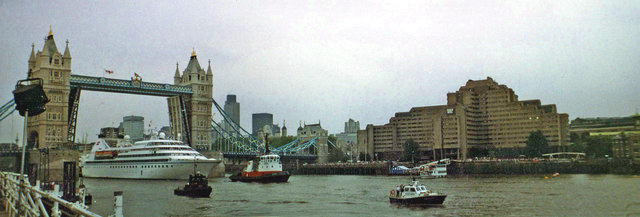
Star Legend as Royal Viking Queen in 1994 crossing under Tower Bridge in London

The construction of the ultra-luxury cruise yacht Royal Viking Queen began in 1990 by Schichau-Seebeckwerft in Bremerhaven, Germany. She was originally planned and ordered for Seabourn Cruise Line in 1990, but was delayed due to investors' financial constraints. The ship was ultimately purchased by Royal Viking Line, and was the last ship they built, as well as the smallest. She was launched in May 1991 and completed in February 1992, then put into service for Kloster Cruise. She operated her sea trials and her maiden voyage began on 11 February 1992 and was finished on 29 February 1992. The ship operated on various crossings for Royal Viking Line, a Kloster subsidiary.

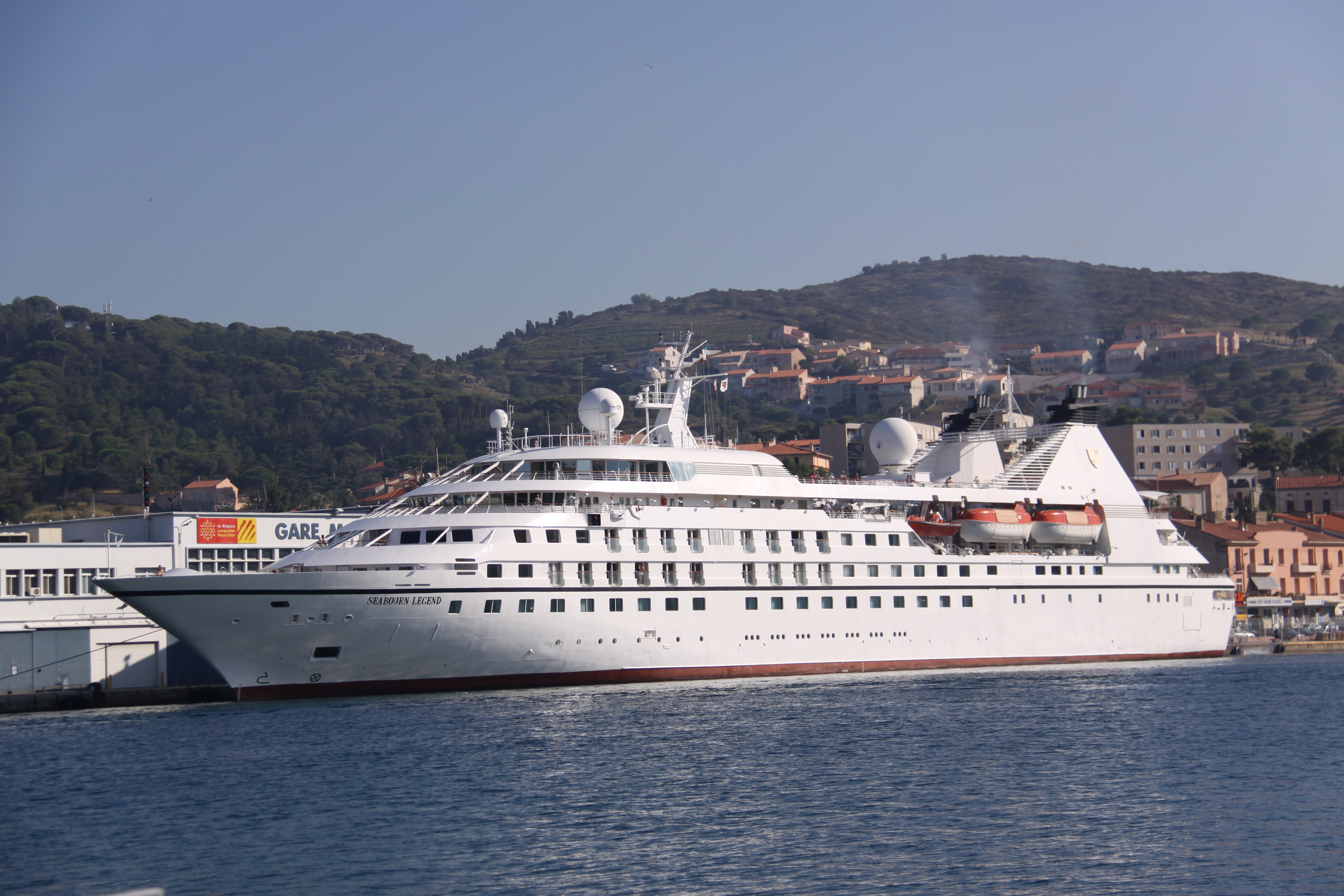
Star Legend as Seabourn Legend in 2010

In 1995, the vessel's name was changed to Queen Odyssey after it was assigned to Royal Cruise Line, another Kloster subsidiary. It remained in operation for Royal Cruise Line until January 1996, when It was sold to Seabourn and joined her sister ships.

Seabourn Legend was featured in the 1997 film Speed 2: Cruise Control.

She departed the Seabourn fleet in April 2015, and entered service for Windstar Cruises in May 2015.

In 2018, Windstar Cruises announced that Star Breeze, Star Pride and Star Legend would be lengthened by adding a new midship section at Fincantieri in Palermo. Construction of the new section started on 6 September 2019 and works on the ship started in March 2020. The lengthening was originally scheduled to be finished in June 2020, but was delayed because of Asbestos found in the engine room of Star Breeze as well as the COVID-19 pandemic and completed in May 2021.
