= Atlas Ocean Voyages =

Cruise line

- Type: Cruise Line
- Industry: Hospitality
- Founded: 2019
- Headquarters: Ft Lauderdale, Florida, United States
- Key people: James Rodriguez (President)
- Services: Cruise ship holidays
- Parent: Mystic Invest Holding
- Website: atlasoceanvoyages.com

Atlas Ocean Voyages is a US subsidiary of Mystic Invest Holding based in Portugal. The company was established in September 2019 and is headquartered in Fort Lauderdale, Florida. The line operates three small expedition-style ships that travel to worldwide destinations.

== History ==
The cruise line was formed in 2019 with two new ships on order. In Jan 2020 the line ordered an additional four new ships, The World Navigator debuted in August 2021 as the line's first ship. In November 2022 the line's second ship World Traveller debuted.

== Fleet ==
=== Current fleet ===
Ship	Image	Delivered	Builder	In service for Atlas	Gross tonnage	Capacity	Flag	Notes
World Navigator		2021	WestSEA Shipyard, Viana do Castelo, Portugal	2021–present	9,935 ton	200	Portugal	First ship for the line
World Traveller		2022	WestSEA Shipyard, Viana do Castelo, Portugal	2022–present	9,935 ton	200	Portugal	
World Voyager		2020	WestSEA Shipyard, Viana do Castelo, Portugal	2023–present	9,935 ton	200	Portugal	Chartered to Nicko Cruises until 2023, transferred to Atlas Ocean Voyages

=== Future fleet ===
Ship	Image	Delivery Date	Builder	Gross tonnage	Capacity	Notes
World Adventurer		2028	China Merchants Shipyard, China	26,000-ton	400	First luxury expedition sailing yacht in the world, equipped with three SolidSail 800 units
World Discoverer		2027	WestSEA Shipyard, Viana do Castelo, Portugal	9,935-ton	200	Officially announced since 2024 but absent from company's official website

=== Cancelled projects ===
Ship	Delivery Date	Builder	Gross tonnage	Capacity	Notes
World Seeker	2025	WestSEA Shipyard, Viana do Castelo, Portugal	9,315-ton	224	Sold during construction to Windstar Cruises. Renamed Star Seeker and Star Explorer
World Explorer	2026	WestSEA Shipyard, Viana do Castelo, Portugal	9,934-ton	224	Sold during construction to Windstar Cruises. Renamed Star Seeker and Star Explorer
