= The Anschutz Corporation =

American private holding company

- Type: Private
- Founded: 1958; 68 years ago
- Founder: Fred Anschutz
- Headquarters: Denver, Colorado, United States
- Owner: Philip Anschutz
- Subsidiaries: Anschutz Entertainment Group; Clarity Media Group; Xanterra Travel Collection
- Website: aegworldwide.com

The Anschutz Corporation is an American private holding company headquartered in Denver, Colorado, United States. The company was started in 1958 by Fred Anschutz, a wildcatter, who developed and operated oil wells. Philip Anschutz, Fred's eldest son, assumed control of the company in 1962 and diversified it with holdings in the entertainment and hospitality industries.

The Anschutz Exploration Corporation subsidiary has continued the original business of discovering and developing oil and gas wells, with particular focus on projects in Colorado, Utah and Wyoming.

== Anschutz Entertainment Group (AEG) ==
The company's entertainment industry holdings are mostly controlled by its subsidiary Anschutz Entertainment Group (AEG), a sporting and music entertainment presenter and one of the world's largest owners of sports teams and live event venues. The company is further broken down into several groups including AEG Presents, AEG Sports, AXS.com and the Anschutz Film Group. AEG Presents organizes several large music entertainment festivals including Coachella and Stagecoach.

=== AEG Sports ===
AEG Sports owns the LA Galaxy soccer team and the Los Angeles Kings ice hockey team as well as several other sports teams around the world, and Anschutz Film Group owns Bristol Bay Productions and Walden Media. The Anschutz Corporation also owns Ken Ehrlich Productions and the Clarity Media Group, the parent company of The Gazette, a newspaper in Colorado Springs and Washington Examiner, a conservative news website and weekly magazine.

== Xanterra Travel Collection ==
The company's hospitality industry holdings are mostly controlled by its subsidiary Xanterra Travel Collection. Xanterra holds the franchise rights to operate resorts inside several major national parks including Death Valley (Oasis at Death Valley), Yellowstone (Old Faithful Inn, Lake Yellowstone Hotel, and several others), and the Grand Canyon (Bright Angel Lodge, El Tovar Hotel, Maswik Lodge and Phantom Ranch). Xanterra also operates the Grand Canyon Railway, Kingsmill Resort, and Windstar Cruises.

== The Broadmoor-Sea Island Company ==
The Anschutz Corporation also owns The Broadmoor-Sea Island Company which operates The Broadmoor hotel, The Broadmoor Manitou and Pikes Peak Cog Railway and the Sea Island resort.
