= Praia da Balaia =

Beach in Albufeira, Portugal

- Beach
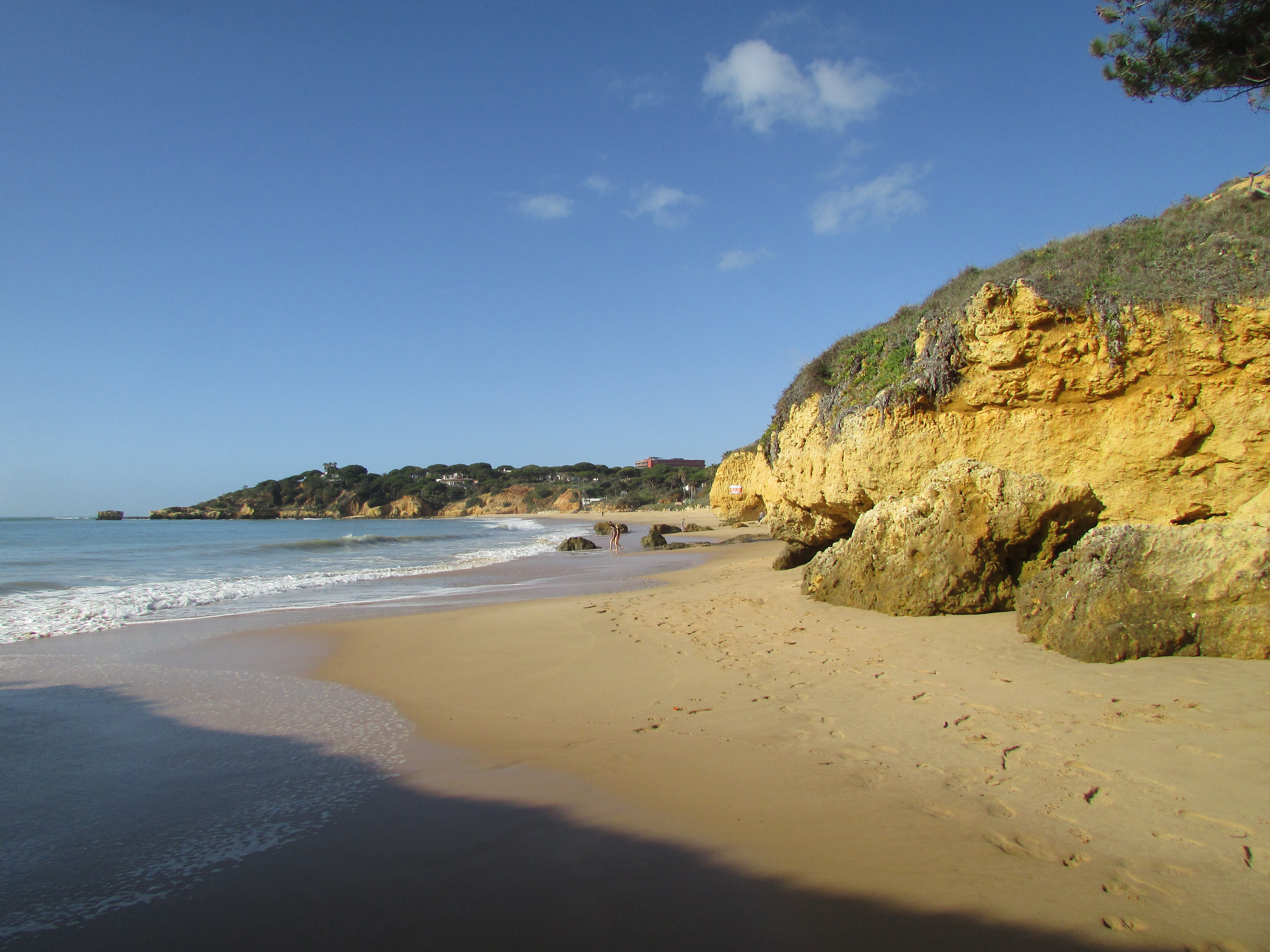
- Balaia Beach

- Location of Praia da Balaia
- Coordinates: 37°5′17.1″N 8°12′38.5″W
- Location: Albufeira, Algarve, Portugal

Praia da Balaia is a small satellite beach at the eastern end of its larger neighbour, Praia Santa Eulália, on the Atlantic south coast of the Algarve. It is within the municipality of Albufeira and is 3.1 kilometres (1.9 mi) east of the town of Albufeira and 1.7 kilometres (1.1 mi) west of the coastal village of Olhos de Água.

== Description ==
The beach is set into a small cove formed by recesses in the low cliffs and rock formations. The beach also includes several sandy recesses running eastwards, some of which are only accessible during the very low tides. These smaller beaches are also known as Praia do Spout Silvas, a name rarely used. The western part of Balaia can be accessed via a set of wooden boardwalks and steps which lead down the side of the cliffs from the Holiday developments that lay to the north of this part of the shoreline. The steps are often in a poor state of repair due to storm damage.
