= Windstar turbine =

Type of wind turbine

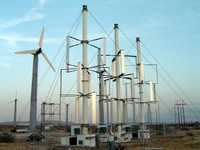
Array in Palm Springs

The Windstar vertical-axis turbine is a lift-type device with straight blades attached at each end to a central rotating shaft. Windstar turbines were invented by Robert Nason Thomas and developed by Wind Harvest International, Inc., formerly the Wind Harvest Company, based in Point Reyes, California. Windstar turbines are operated as Linear Array Vortex Turbine Systems (LAVTS). Each rotor unit has a dual braking system of pneumatic disc brakes and blade pitch. All Windstar models use off-the-shelf generators, gearboxes, bearings and other components.

== History ==
In 2001 and 2002, three guyed prototype versions of the Windstar Model 530G were installed in Palm Springs, California. The Model 530G prototype used extruded aluminum blades, was supported by a guyed cable system and was rated at 25 kW. The three 530G turbines were placed in close proximity, creating the first Linear Array Vortex Turbine System (LAVTS). The 530G LAVTS was rated at 75 KW and was run continuously for five years to collect performance data.

In 2006, Wind Harvest International began design work on a series of Windstar turbine models to take advantage of the properties demonstrated in the 530G LAVTS prototype: Model 636, 1500 and 3000 turbines. The Model 636 is a direct evolution of the 530G, with an increase in blade length, in order to increase swept area, and including a modified bearing design. The 1500 and 3000 turbine models stand 50 feet (15 m) high with a 40-foot-tall (12 m) rotor and 50-75 kW generators. The Windstar 1500 is 37.5 feet (11.4 m) wide and is designed for higher wind speed locations. The Windstar 3000 will be 75 feet (23 m) wide to operate better in lower wind speed locations (14-16 mph). Model 636 continues to use extruded aluminum blades, similar to the 530G. Models 1500 and 3000 use pultruded fiberglass blades.

By 2010, Windstar Model 636 turbines were placed on the transitional list for approved wind energy generation systems qualifying for the FIT (Feed-in-Tariff) energy pricing in the UK. In 2011, Wind Harvest International, Inc. began the process for MCS certification of the Model 636 LAVTS.

== Linear Array Vortex Turbine Systems ==
The Linear Array Vortex Turbine System (LAVTS) consists of three or more Windstar vertical-axis rotors, each with their own 25-75 kW generator, placed in a linear array with each rotor's blades passing within two feet of its neighbor. In this configuration, the center rotors gain an increase in energy output and efficiency. Observation of this effect (the coupled vortex effect) on Windstar turbines in field tests led to the issuance of U.S. patent 6,784,566.

== Coupled Vortex Effect ==
Windstar turbines are built in arrays of three or more turbines in order to take advantage of the "coupled vortex effect." The coupled vortex effect was identified through field tests of Windstar 530G turbines and is made possible by the fact that straight-bladed vertical axis wind turbine blades passingnear one another in opposite directions create lift and torque on their neighboring blades, boosting the energy production of an array in comparison with a single turbine's performance. See patent US6784566. A mathematical model of the phenomenon and its effect on Windstar turbine performance was made possible by grant funds from the California Energy Commission in 2010., Research on similar vertical axis turbine configurations have independently confirmed the effect, linking the phenomenon's boost of performance to the fluid efficiency observed in schools of fish.

== Windstar Model 636 ==
Windstar Model 636 is a commercial model of the Windstar turbine offered by Wind Harvest International, Inc. It is a direct evolution of their earlier guyed model the 530G. It uses similar components with some modifications geared toward the commercial market. Modifications of the design include longer blades and a new bearing assembly.

== Windstar Models 1500 and 3000 ==
These two models were designed based on field data from the 530G prototype field testing in the LAVTS configuration. Mathematical modeling of these turbines was conducted by IOPARA, Inc., made possible by a grant from the California Energy Commission in 2010. Model 3000 will stand 50 ft high with a 40 ft tall rotor. The Windstar Model 3000 will be 75 ft wide and used for lower wind speed locations (14-16 mph). The Windstar Model 1500 will have a similar rotor height and will be 37.5 ft wide. The Model 1500 is designed for higher wind speed locations.
