= Wind Spirit (ship) =

Sailing cruise ship commissioned in 1988

- Wind Spirit

History
- Name: Wind Spirit
- Owner: Windstar Cruises Ltd.
- Port of registry: Nassau, Bahamas
- Builder: Ateliers et Chantiers du Havre, Le Havre, France
- Launched: 13 July 1987
- Acquired: 24 March 1988
- Commissioned: April 1988
- Identification: Call sign: C6CY9; IMO number: 8603509; MMSI: 309056000

General characteristics
- Type: Cruise ship
- Tonnage: 5,307 GT
- Length: 134 m (439.63 ft)
- Beam: 15.8 m (51.84 ft)
- Draught: 4.1 m (13.45 ft)
- Installed power: 3150 kW
- Speed: 11 knots (20 km/h)
- Capacity: 148 passengers
- Crew: 90

Wind Spirit is a motor sailing yacht, sailing as a cruise ship for Windstar Cruises. She is one of an unusual class of only three vessels (Wind Star, Wind Spirit and Wind Song), designed as a modern cruise ship but carrying an elaborate system of computer-controlled sails on four masts.

== See also ==
- List of large sailing vessels
