= Windstar Cruises =

Cruise ship line

- Type: Private
- Industry: Hospitality
- Founded: 1984
- Headquarters: Miami, Florida, United States
- Area served: Mediterranean; Northern Europe; Caribbean; Central America; Asia-Pacific
- Services: Cruise ship holidays
- Owner: Xanterra Travel Collection
- Parent: The Anschutz Corporation
- Website: www.windstarcruises.com

Windstar Cruises is a cruise line that operates a fleet of small luxury cruise ships. Its six yachts carry just 148 to 310 guests and cruise to 50 nations, calling at 150 ports throughout Europe, the South Pacific, the Caribbean, and Central America. In May 2014, Windstar added to its sailing yachts by adding the Star Pride power yacht, followed by Star Breeze and Star Legend in May 2015. The additional capacity opened up new itineraries such as voyages to Iceland, the Panama Canal, and Costa Rica and allowed Windstar Cruises to sail Tahiti year round.

Windstar offers a variety of cruise types include culinary & wine cruises, cruise tours, themed cruises, holiday sailings and more.

== History ==
Founded by ship entrepreneur Karl G. Andrén, the line was established as Windstar Sail Cruises in 1984, and its first ship, the Wind Star was launched in 1986, and was followed by the Wind Song which was launched in 1987 and Wind Spirit which was launched in 1988. Two additional ships were ordered from the French "Sociéte Nouvelle des Ateliers et Chantiers du Havre" shipyard: the Wind Surf and the Wind Saga. These two ships were to be larger than the originals, holding over twice the number of passengers and reaching a length of 660 feet (200 m), compared to the smaller vessels of 440 feet (130 m) in length.

=== Purchase by Holland America Line ===
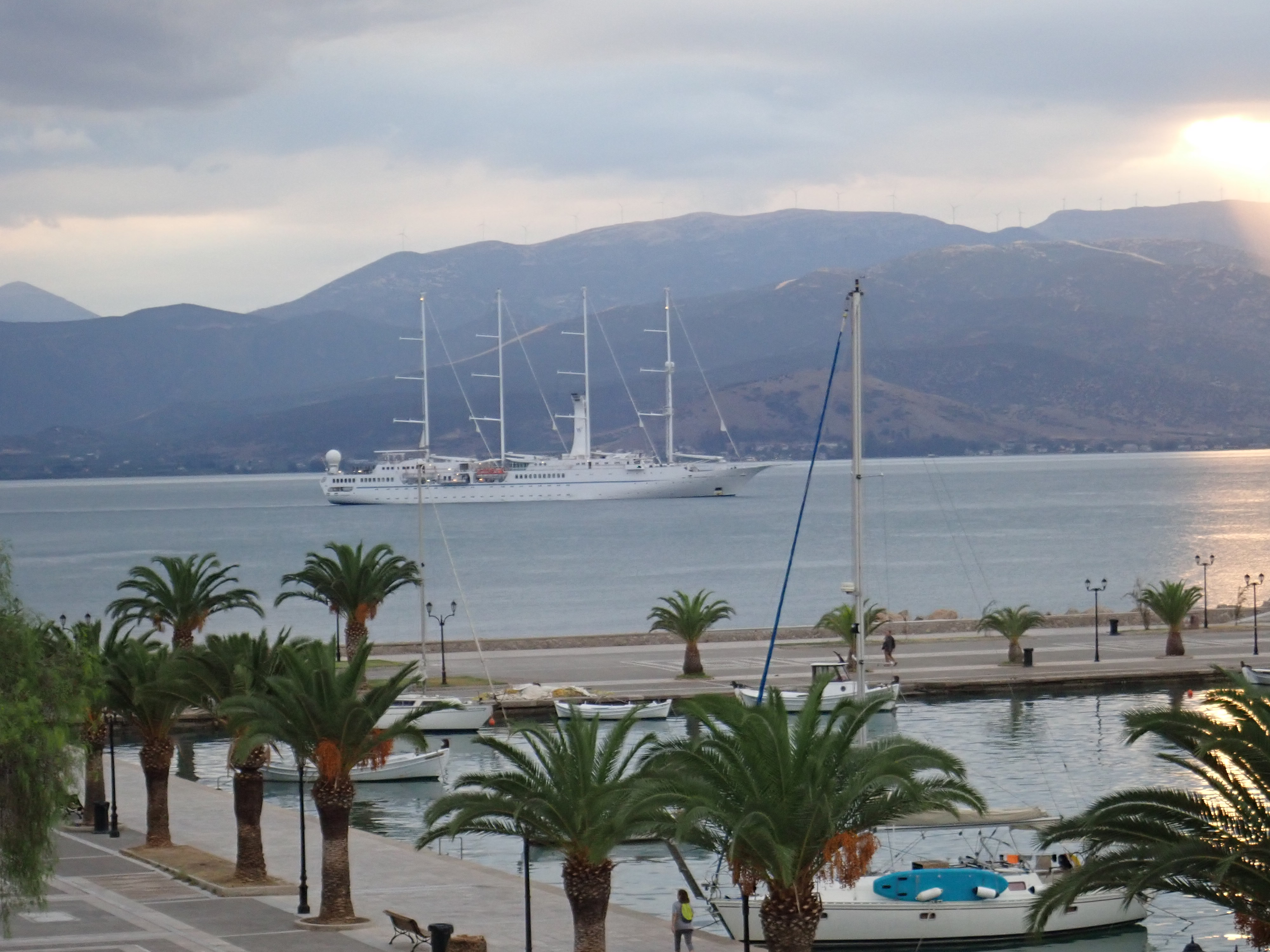
Windstar mini cruise ship at Nafplio harbour

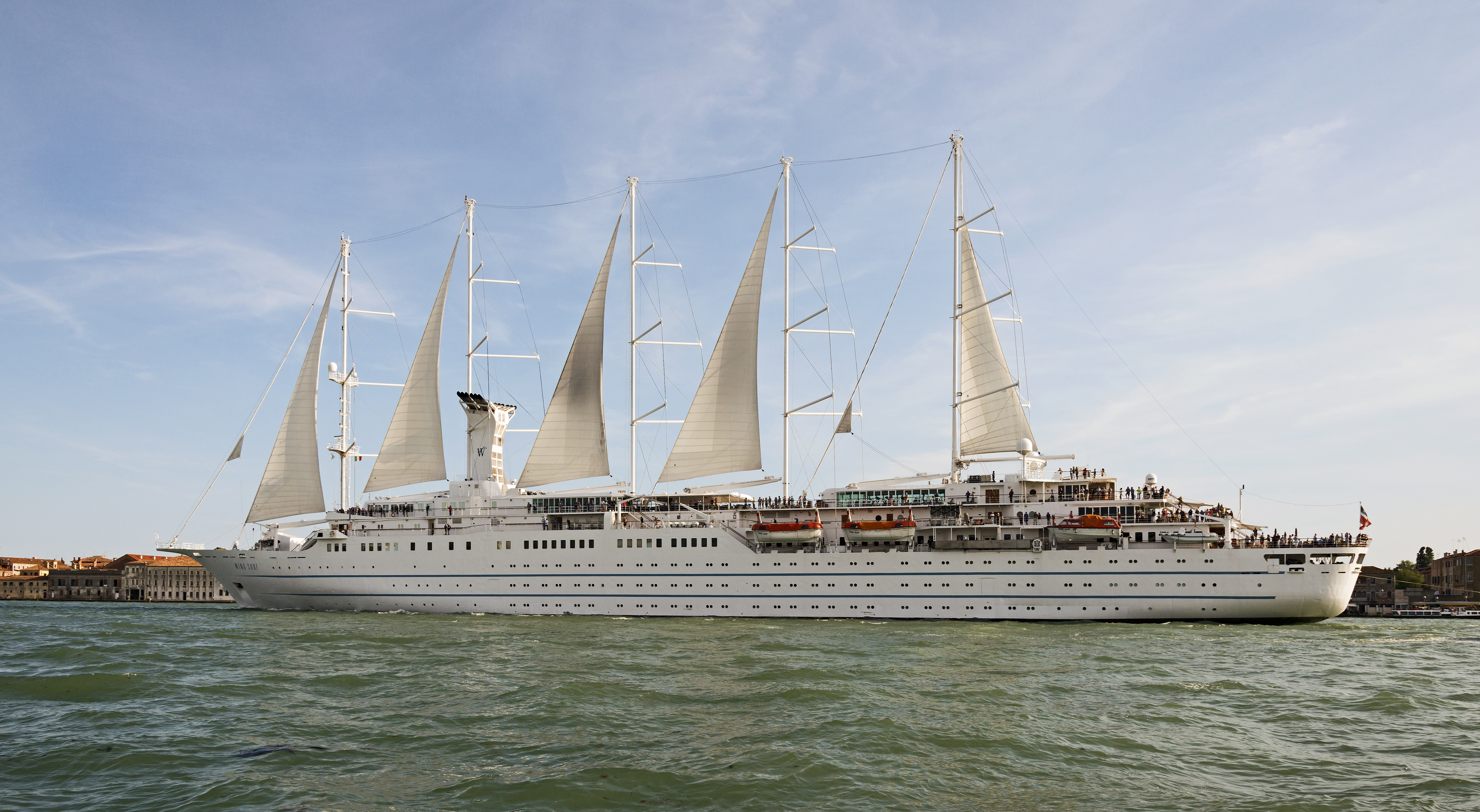
msy Wind Surf

Holland America Line (HAL) purchased 50% of Windstar Sail Cruises in 1987 and purchased the balance of the company in 1988. HAL became a subsidiary of Carnival Corporation & plc in 1989. The option to continue building the Wind Surf and the Wind Saga was passed up by HAL. With assistance from the French Government these two larger ships were built for Club Med as Club Med I and Club Med II, with HAL / Carnival retaining rights of first refusal for purchase. A few years later, HAL / Carnival planned to buy the Club Med I and the Club Med II with permission. However, Windstar cruises was unable to purchase the ships and rename them to Wind Surf and the Wind Saga because they had only enough money to purchase one ship. So in 1998, Windstar acquired the sail cruiser Club Med I from Club Med Cruises, and rechristened her to her original name Wind Surf.

=== Sale of Windstar to Xanterra Travel Collection ===
In March 2007, Carnival sold Windstar to Ambassadors International for $100 million.

On April 1, 2011, Windstar's parent company Ambassadors International filed for Chapter 11 Bankruptcy. A bankruptcy court in Delaware held a two-day auction and Anschutz Corporation won Windstar Cruises with a bid of $39 million. Subsidiary Xanterra Travel Collection is now the parent company.

=== Fleet expansion ===
In 2013 Windstar completed the purchase of Seabourn Cruise Line's Star Pride, Star Legend, and Star Breeze. Star Pride entered service on May 5, 2014 with an inaugural cruise from Barcelona, after some upgrades. In May 2015, Windstar increased its fleet from four yachts to six with Star Breeze and Star Legend. Both yachts underwent a $17 million, three-week dry dock in Genoa, Italy, before a christening ceremony in May. In 2016, Star Pride underwent a renovation to refurbish public spaces, expand the outdoor seating of the Veranda restaurant and remodeled the AmphorA restaurant.

In June 2018, Star Legend became the largest cruise ship to ever travel through Seattle's Ballard Locks and the Lake Washington Ship Canal. In November 2018, Windstar announced that the three "Star Class" ships—Star Pride, Star Breeze and Star Legend—would be lengthened by 84 feet (26 m). The work is part of the company's US$250 million 'Star Plus' initiative. The work took place at Fincantieri's shipyard in Palermo, Italy.

In 2019, Windstar was named the Best Small Ship Cruise Line by AFAR readers and Condé Nast Traveler's Readers' Choice Awards. In October 2019, Windstar Cruises announced that it would begin offering cruises to Alaska in 2021.

=== Recent history ===
In April 2024, it was announced that Windstar would be adding two more ships to its fleet by 2026. The first of these is Windstar's first ever new build, the Star Seeker, which was originally ordered for Atlas Ocean Voyages as World Seeker and was scheduled to do its maiden voyage from Malaga, Spain in December 2025. The second, Star Explorer, is currently sailing as World Explorer and is on charter to Quark Expeditions. This ship will enter service at the end of the charter agreement in December 2026.

== Fleet ==
The ships are relatively small, with the Wind Surf having a capacity for about 300 passengers, and the others about 150. Star Pride carries up to 212 passengers in 106 suites as well as sister ships Star Legend and Star Breeze.

The ships are registered in the Bahamas. Under this flag they are some of the few cruise ships in the world where passengers are still allowed on the bridge (though not when entering or leaving port). With a shallow draft of only 14 feet (4.3 m), the ships can enter ports that are inaccessible to larger cruise liners. In some cases, passengers need to take smaller boats into port (such as to Lipari) when the ship is at anchor.

=== Current fleet ===
Name	Built	Builder	Entered service for Windstar	Gross Tonnage	Flag	Notes	Image
Wind Star	1986	Sociéte Nouvelle des Ateliers et Chantiers du Havre	1986–present	5,307 tons	Bahamas	Windstar Cruise's first ship	
Wind Spirit	1988	Sociéte Nouvelle des Ateliers et Chantiers du Havre	1988–present	5,307 tons	Bahamas		
Wind Surf	1989	Sociéte Nouvelle des Ateliers et Chantiers du Havre	1998–present	14,745 tons	Bahamas	Windstar Cruise's biggest ship in the fleet and was previously Club Med 1 for Club Med	
Star Pride	1988	Schichau Seebeckwerft	2014–present	12,995 tons	Bahamas	Previously Seabourn Pride for Seabourn Cruise Line, stretched in	
Star Breeze	1988	Schichau Seebeckwerft	May 2015–present	12,995 tons	Bahamas	Previously Seabourn Sprit for Seabourn Cruise Line	
Star Legend	1990	Schichau Seebeckwerft	May 2015 – present	12,995 tons	Bahamas	Previously Seabourn Legend for Seabourn Cruise Line	
Star Seeker	2025	WestSEA Shipyard		~ 9,934 tons	Bahamas	Originally ordered for Atlas Ocean Voyages as World Seeker. delivered in December 2025	

=== Future fleet ===
Name	Built	Builder	Will enter service for Windstar	Gross Tonnage	Flag	Notes
Star Explorer	2019	WestSEA Shipyard	December 2026	9,923 tons	Bahamas	Currently operating for Quark Expeditions as World Explorer.

=== Former fleet ===
Name	Built	Builder	Entered service for Windstar	Gross Tonnage	Flag	Notes	Image
Wind Song	1987	Sociéte Nouvelle des Ateliers et Chantiers du Havre	1987 - 2002	5,307 tons	Bahamas	The ship suffered an engine room fire on December 1, 2002 and was scuttled and sunk the next month on January 22, 2003.	

== See also ==
- List of large sailing vessels
