= Star Breeze =

Cruise ship built in 1989

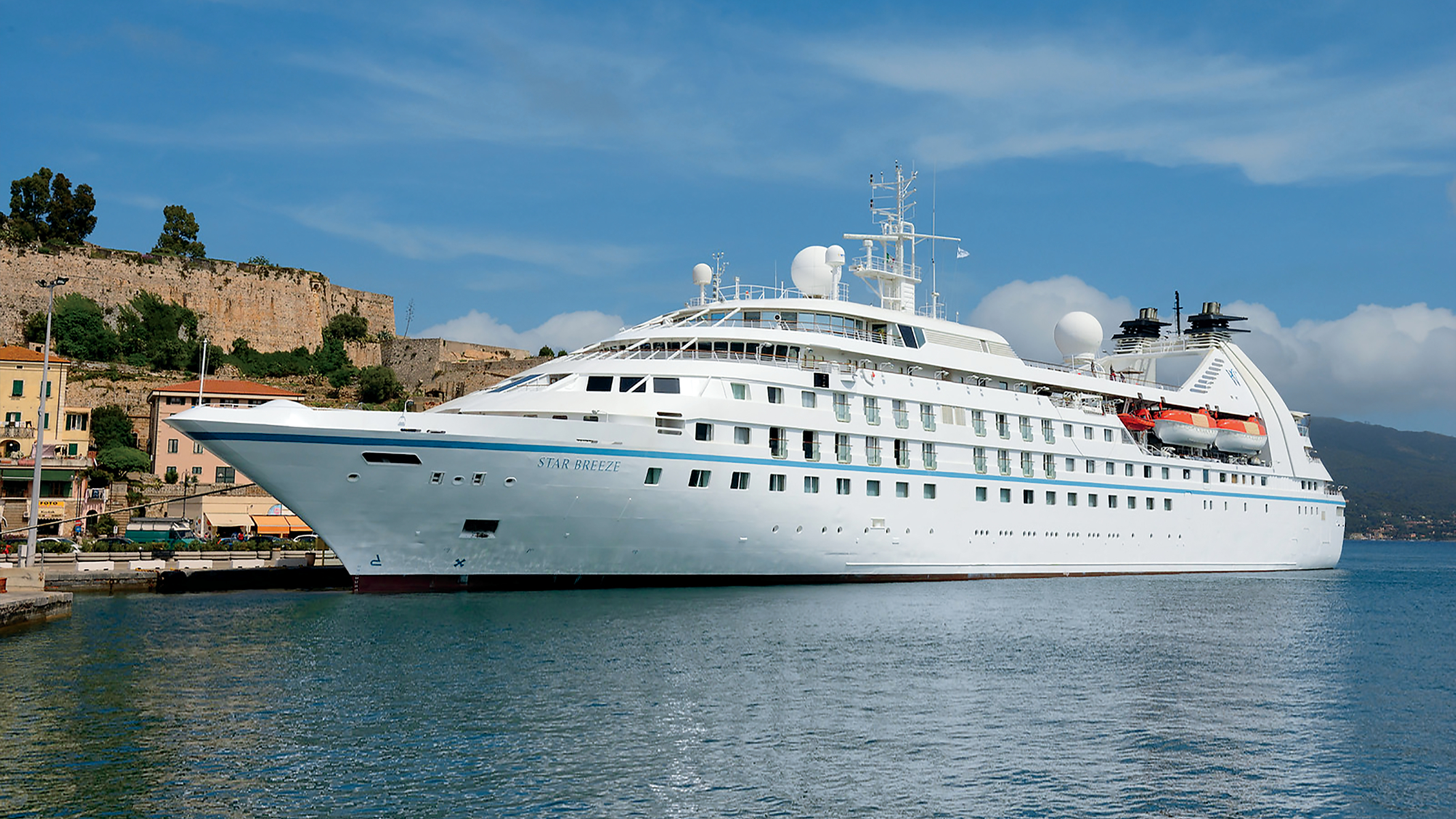
- Star Breeze in Portoferraio, Italy

History
- Name: 1989–2015: Seabourn Spirit: 2015–present: Star Breeze
- Operator: 1989–2015: Seabourn Cruise Line; 2015–present: Windstar Cruises
- Port of registry: 1989–2002: Oslo, Norway; 2002–present: Nassau, Bahamas
- Builder: Schichau Seebeckwerft; Bremerhaven, Germany
- Yard number: 1070
- Launched: November 1988
- Acquired: 7 November 1989
- In service: 28 November 1989
- Refit: 2007
- Identification: Call sign: C6FR4; IMO number: 8807997; MMSI number: 311083000
- Status: In service

General characteristics
- Tonnage: 9,975 GT
- Length: 134 m (439 ft 8 in) (as built), 159.6 m (523 ft 7 in) (2019)
- Beam: 19.2 m (63 ft 0 in)
- Draft: 5 m (16 ft 5 in)
- Decks: 4 (passenger decks)
- Installed power: 4 × Normo-Bergen diesels; combined 7280 kW
- Speed: 16 knots (30 km/h; 18 mph)
- Capacity: 208 passengers (as built), 312 passengers (2019)
- Crew: 164
- Armament: 1 × LRAD

Star Breeze (formerly Seabourn Spirit) is a German-built cruise ship completed in 1989. The luxury liner travels between Europe and Africa, and is owned by Windstar Cruises. In early 2005, she was rated the best small cruise ship by Condé Nast. In April 2015, she departed the Seabourn fleet, and on 6 May 2015 she was rechristened and entered service with Windstar Cruises.

== Pirate attack ==
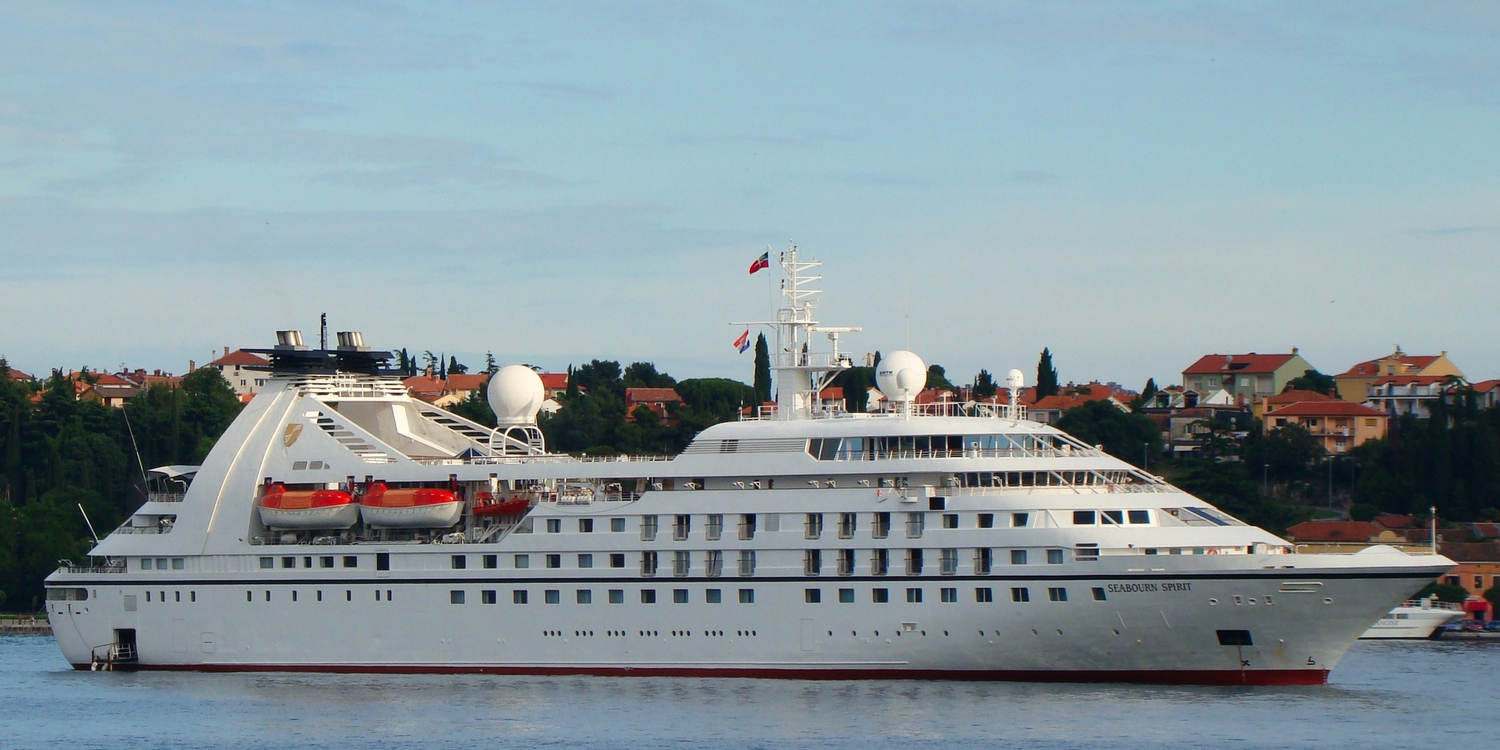
Seabourn Spirit in Rovinj, Croatia

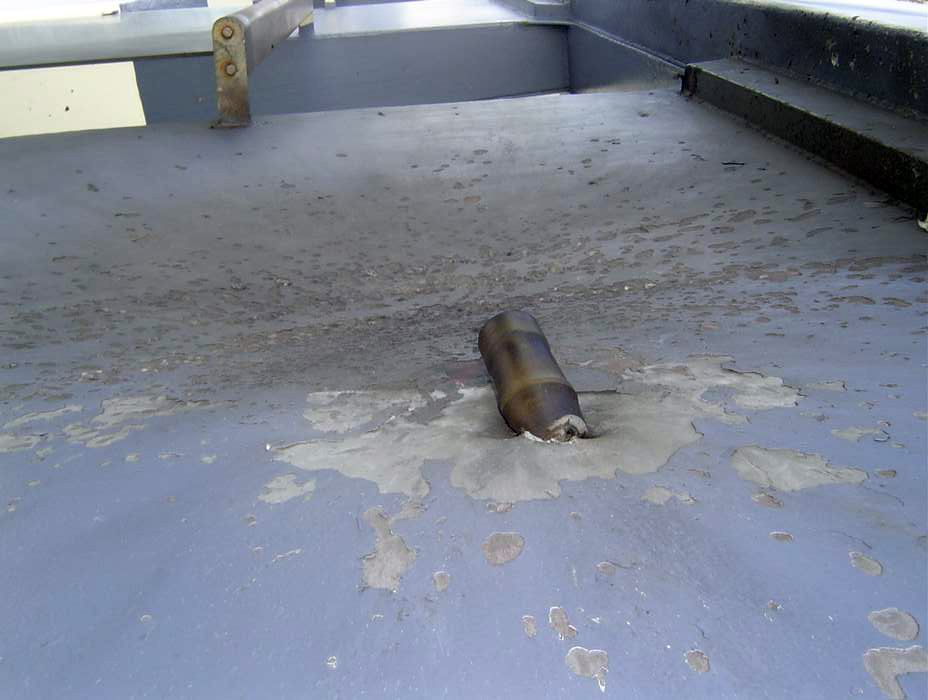
The motor of a rocket-propelled grenade (RPG), shown after striking the Seabourn Spirit

On 5 November 2005 at 5:50 a.m., while Seabourn Spirit was underway 115 km off the coast of Somalia with 115 passengers, the ship was attacked by two pirate speedboats launched by a mother ship. Both machine guns and rocket-propelled grenades (RPGs) were fired at the ship, and the remains of an RPG's rocket motor wedged itself in the wall of a room and was disarmed by sailors from USS Gonzalez after the attack. It was reported that a second RPG bounced off the stern. No passengers were injured, but the ship's master-at-arms, Som Bahadur Gurung, was hit by shrapnel whilst attempting to combat the raiders with a long-range acoustic device (LRAD). The sonic device repelled the pirates by blasting a powerful sound wave.

Security officer Michael Groves and British shipmate Som Bahadur Gurung (an ex-Gurkha) were honoured for their bravery by Queen Elizabeth II at Buckingham Palace on Wednesday, 16 May 2007, receiving the Queen's Gallantry Medal and the Queen's Commendation for Bravery, respectively.

The ship then altered its course to Port Victoria in the Seychelles for repairs rather than the originally planned Mombasa in Kenya. The ship then sailed to Singapore and returned to its original schedule.

== Later service ==
In 2019, the vessel was "stretched". She was cut in half and a new 84-foot section was inserted in the middle, with 50 new staterooms, accommodating 100 extra passengers. The lengthening was originally supposed to be completed in February 2020, but was delayed to November 2020 because of asbestos found in the engine room.
