= Wind Song (ship) =

4-masted motor sailing yacht used as a cruise ship

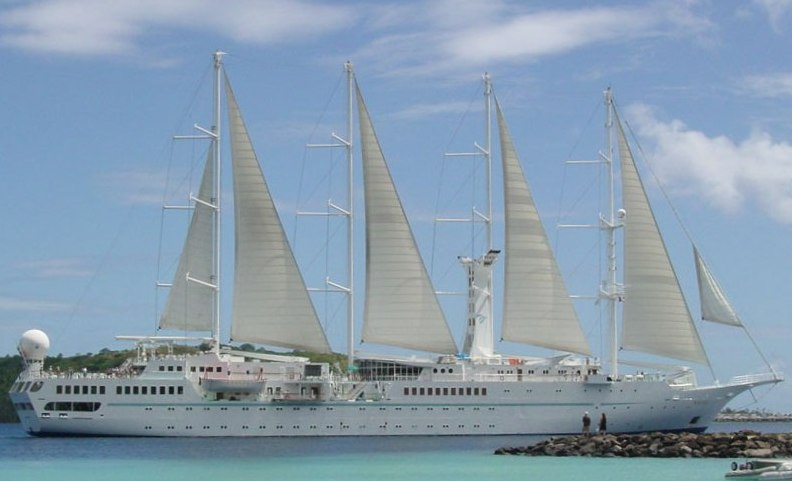
- Wind Song in Bora Bora

History
- Name: Wind Song
- Owner: Windstar Cruises Ltd.
- Port of registry: Nassau, Bahamas
- Builder: Ateliers et Chantiers du Havre, Le Havre, France
- Launched: August 1986
- Identification: Call sign: C6CB2; IMO number: 8420880; MMSI: 309535000
- Fate: fire onboard on December 1, 2002, scuttled on January 23, 2003

General characteristics
- Type: Cruise ship
- Tonnage: 5,307 GT
- Length: 134 m (439.63 ft)
- Beam: 15.8 m (51.84 ft)
- Draught: 4.1 m (13.45 ft)
- Installed power: (3150 kW)
- Speed: 11 knots (20 km/h; 13 mph)
- Capacity: 159 passengers

Wind Song was a 4-masted motor sailing yacht used as a cruise ship by Windstar Cruises from 1987 until 2002, when the ship suffered an engine room fire.

Wind Song was one of an unusual class of only three vessels (Wind Star, Wind Spirit and Wind Song), designed as a modern cruise ship but carrying an elaborate system of computer-controlled sails on four masts. The ship's usual itinerary was an inter-island cruise in French Polynesia and in the Bahamas.

== Fire ==
On December 1, 2002, according to a first-hand passenger account, an engine room fire forced passengers into lifeboats at 3:15 a.m. where they'd hoped to stay only until the fire was under control. At 5:04 a.m. a small explosion was heard from the front of the ship and the captain gave the order to abandon ship. All 127 passengers and 92 crew members were evacuated safely. Passengers were transported by fast ferry to Raiatea, a nearby island where they arrived at approx 8 a.m. Over the course of that day, they were flown on scheduled and charter Air Tahiti flights to Papeete.

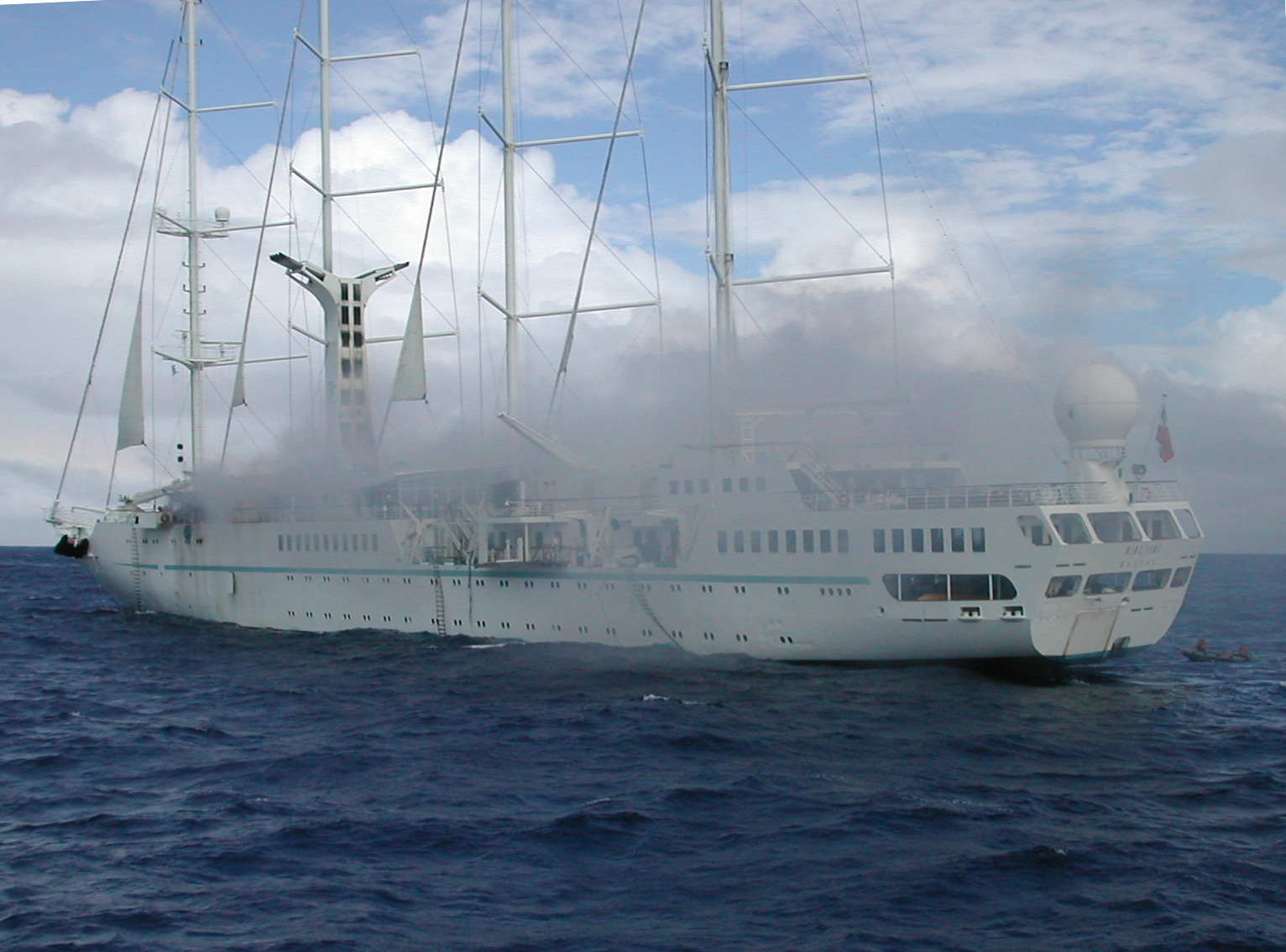
Wind Song on fire

The French Navy put out the fire and towed the ship to Papeete, where examination showed extensive damage to engineering spaces, although the passenger areas were mostly intact. Subsequently, the Navy demanded compensation for its services, and French Polynesian government seized the Wind Song. However, both Holland America Line (owner of Windstar Cruises at the time, itself a subsidiary of Carnival Corporation & plc) and Carnival Corporation & plc was unwilling to pay the costs involved, and even scrapping was uneconomical, because of the ship's small size and remoteness from shipbreakers in India, China, and elsewhere.

On January 22, 2003, with the agreement of Holland America and Carnival, the President of the Territorial Government of French Polynesia, Gaston Flosse, ordered the scuttling of the Wind Song. That night the ship was towed into the Sea of the Moon between Tahiti and Moorea and sunk in 9,843 feet of water, at latitude 17.45S, longitude 149.48W.
