= Xanterra Travel Collection =

Private management company in Greenwood Village, Colorado

Xanterra Travel Collection (formerly Xanterra Parks & Resorts, Amfac Resorts and Amfac Parks & Resorts) is a privately owned American park and resort management company based in Greenwood Village, Colorado. Denver-based entertainment magnate Philip Anschutz controls the company.

Xanterra is contracted by the National Park Service to provide lodging and other tourism services inside several national parks. Current concessions contracts include Glacier National Park, Grand Canyon National Park (South Rim), Mount Rushmore National Memorial, Rocky Mountain National Park, and Yellowstone National Park.

The name comes from a combination of Xanadu and terra (Earth).

== History ==
A legacy of the 19th-century Fred Harvey Company, after the death of the founder's grandson in 1965, the company became affiliated with Chicago-based JMB Realty, which acquired large Hawaii landholder Amfac in 1968 and broke it up into independent corporations, including Amfac Resorts. In 1995, Amfac bought the large national parks management concession TW Recreational Services from Flagstar. In 2002, Amfac changed its corporate name to Xanterra after the bankruptcy of Amfac Hawaii. The Anschutz Corporation bought Xanterra from JMB in 2008.
