= Wind Star (ship) =

Motor sailing yacht sailing as a cruise ship for Windstar Cruises

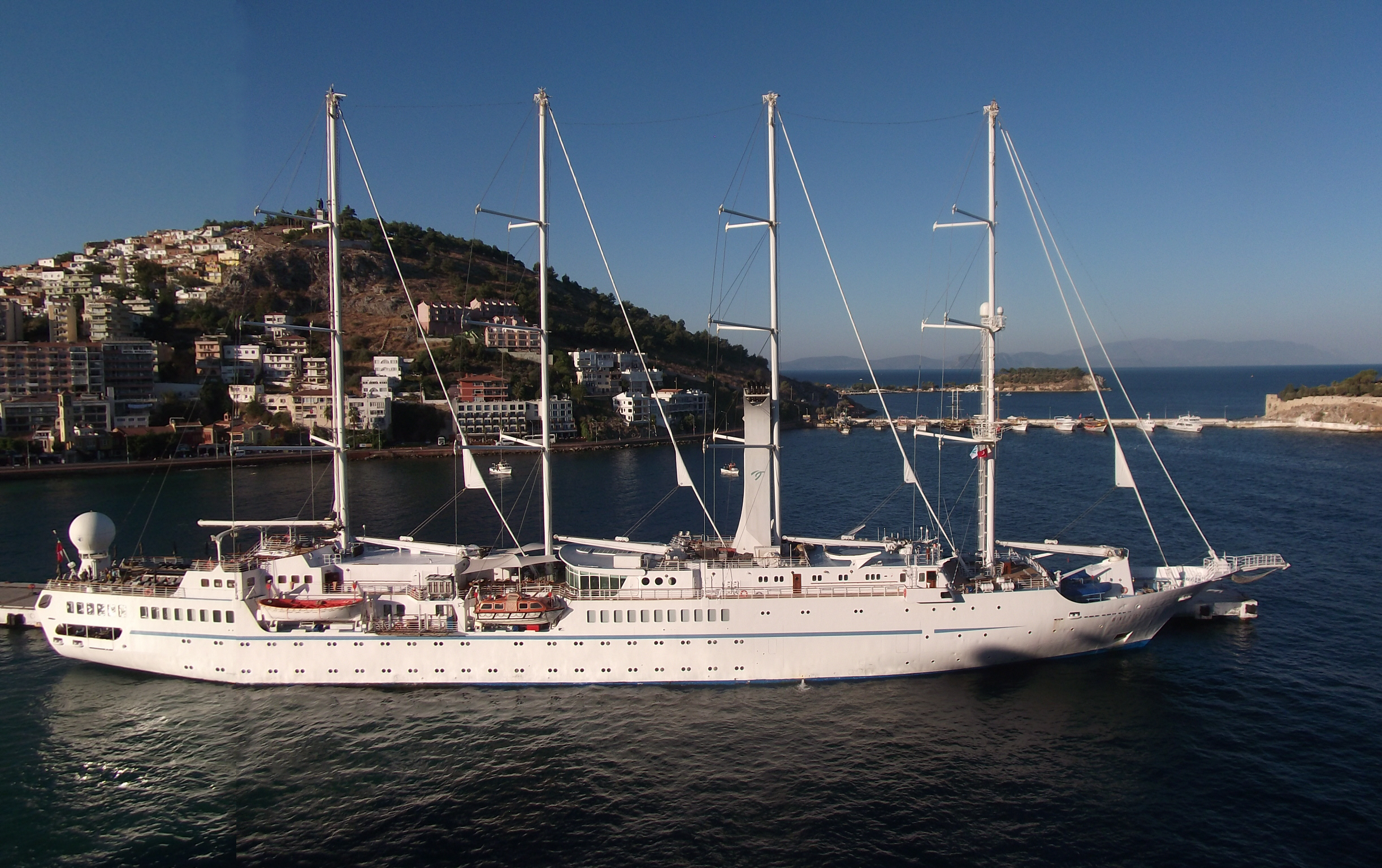
- Wind Star

History
- Name: Wind Star
- Owner: Windstar Cruises Ltd.
- Port of registry: Nassau, Bahamas
- Builder: Ateliers et Chantiers du Havre, Le Havre, France
- Launched: 13 November 1985
- Acquired: 1986
- In service: 1986
- Identification: Call sign: C6CA9; IMO number: 8420878; MMSI number: 309163000

General characteristics
- Type: Cruise ship
- Tonnage: 5,307 GT
- Length: 134 m (439.63 ft)
- Beam: 15.8 m (51.84 ft)
- Draught: 4.1 m (13.45 ft)
- Decks: 4
- Installed power: (3150 kW)
- Speed: 10 knots (19 km/h; 12 mph) with engines only; up to 15.8 knots (29.3 km/h; 18.2 mph) with prevailing wind
- Capacity: 148 passengers
- Crew: 101

Wind Star is a motor sailing yacht, sailing as a cruise ship for Windstar Cruises. She is one of an unusual class of only three vessels (Wind Star, Wind Spirit and Wind Song), designed as a modern cruise ship but carrying an elaborate system of computer-controlled sails on four masts.

== See also ==
- List of large sailing vessels
- Official website
