= List of U.S. flagged cruise ships =

List of current U.S. flagged cruise ships and river boats in the United States. Due to the Passenger Vessel Services Act of 1886, these are the only overnight passenger ships currently eligible to sail solely between U.S. ports without the need for a foreign port stopover.

== Current coastal and ocean-going ships ==
Name	Photo	Current Cruise Line	Entered service	Passenger capacity	Builder	Notes
Wilderness Explorer		UnCruise Adventures	1976	76	Eastern Shipbuilding Group in Panama City, Florida	Formerly Spirit of Discovery
Admiralty Dream		Alaskan Dream Cruises	1979	54	Blount Boats Shipyard in Warren, Rhode Island	Formerly Spirit of Alaska
Baranof Dream		Alaskan Dream Cruises	1980	49	Blount Boats Shipyard in Warren, Rhode Island	Formerly Spirit of Columbia
National Geographic Sea Bird		Lindblad-National Geographic	1982	62	Nichols Bros. Boat Builders in Freeland, Washington	Formerly MS Sea Bird, Majestic Explorer
National Geographic Sea Lion		Lindblad-National Geographic	1982	62	Nichols Bros. Boat Builders in Freeland, Washington	Formerly MS Sea Lion, Great Rivers Explorer
The Legacy		UnCruise Adventures	1983	86	Bender Shipbuilding & Repair in Mobile, Alabama	Formerly Wilderness Legacy, Safari Legacy, Spirit of 98
Chichagof Dream		Alaskan Dream Cruises	1984	74	JeffBoat Shipyard in Jeffersonville, Indiana	Formerly Nantucket Clipper, Spirit of Nantucket, Spirit of Glacier Bay
Safari Endeavor		UnCruise Adventures	1983	84	JeffBoat Shipyard in Jeffersonville, Indiana	Formerly Spirit of Endeavor, Newport Clipper
Wilderness Adventurer		UnCruise Adventures	1984	60	Blount Boats Shipyard in Warren, Rhode Island	Formerly Caribbean Prince
Wilderness Discoverer		UnCruise Adventures	1992	74	Blount Boats Shipyard in Warren, Rhode Island	Formerly Mayan Prince
American Spirit		American Cruise Lines	2005	100	Chesapeake Shipbuilding in Salisbury, Maryland	
Pride of America		NCL America	2005	2,186	Ingalls Shipyards, Pascagoula, Mississippi, and Lloyd Werft, Bremerhaven, Germany	Ordered for American Classic Voyages
American Star		American Cruise Lines	2007	100	Chesapeake Shipbuilding in Salisbury, Maryland	
Independence		American Cruise Lines	2010	104	Chesapeake Shipbuilding in Salisbury, Maryland	
American Constellation		American Cruise Lines	2017	170	Chesapeake Shipbuilding in Salisbury, Maryland	
National Geographic Quest		Lindblad-National Geographic	2017	100	Nichols Bros. Boat Builders in Freeland, Washington	
American Constitution		American Cruise Lines	2018	175	Chesapeake Shipbuilding in Salisbury, Maryland	
National Geographic Venture		Lindblad-National Geographic	2019	100	Nichols Bros. Boat Builders in Freeland, Washington	
American Eagle		American Cruise Lines	2023	109	Chesapeake Shipbuilding in Salisbury, Maryland	Project Blue Fleet
American Glory		American Cruise Lines	2023	109	Chesapeake Shipbuilding in Salisbury, Maryland	Project Blue Fleet

== Current river boats ==
Name	Photo	Current Company	Entered service	Capacity	Builder	Notes
Delta Queen		Delta Queen Steamboat Company	1927	176	California Transportation Company (assembled)	
American Queen		American Queen Voyages	1995	436	McDermott Shipyard in Morgan City, Louisiana	
American Duchess		American Queen Voyages	1995	166	Nichols Bros. Boat Builders in Freeland, Washington	Originally designed and built for Isle of Capri Casinos as a casino boat named Bettendorf Capri
Queen of the West		American Cruise Lines	1995	100	Nichols Bros. Boat Builders in Freeland, Washington	
American Empress		American Queen Voyages	2003	223	Nichols Bros. Boat Builders in Freeland, Washington	
American Pride		American Cruise Lines	2012	150	Chesapeake Shipbuilding in Salisbury, Maryland	
Queen of the Mississippi		American Cruise Lines	2015	150	Chesapeake Shipbuilding in Salisbury, Maryland	
America		American Cruise Lines	2016	185	Chesapeake Shipbuilding in Salisbury, Maryland	
American Song		American Cruise Lines	2018	184	Chesapeake Shipbuilding in Salisbury, Maryland	
American Harmony		American Cruise Lines	2019	190	Chesapeake Shipbuilding in Salisbury, Maryland	
American Jazz		American Cruise Lines	2020	190	Chesapeake Shipbuilding in Salisbury, Maryland	
American Countess		American Queen Voyages	2020	245	Gulf Island Shipyard in Houma, Louisiana	
American Melody		American Cruise Lines	2021	175	Chesapeake Shipbuilding in Salisbury, Maryland	
Viking Mississippi		Viking River Cruises	2022	386	Edison Chouest Offshore Shipyard, Louisiana	
American Symphony		American Cruise Lines	2022	175	Chesapeake Shipbuilding in Salisbury, Maryland	
American Serenade		American Cruise Lines	2023	175	Chesapeake Shipbuilding in Salisbury, Maryland	
Future

== Ships eligible to sail under American flag ==
Passenger ships that are U.S. built, that once sailed under the American flag, and which would be eligible to return to that status:

=== Laid up ===
- Niagara Prince (1994) - Sold and has become the GUYANA GLORY https://www.marinetraffic.com/en/ais/details/ships/shipid:455461/mmsi:369022000/imo:8978629/vessel:GUYANA_GLORY
- Grande Caribe (1997) - laid up when Blount Small Ship Adventures ceased operations in 2020
- Grande Mariner (1998) - sold to NYC Water Cruises and converted to a dinner cruiser https://nycwatercruises.com/pages/grande-mariner
- American Eagle (2000) - moored at Chesapeake Shipbuilding as housing for shipyard contractors

=== Change of registry ===
- Safari Voyager (1982) - registry changed to St Kitts
- Ocean Voyager (2001) - registry changed to Bahamas
- Ocean Navigator(2004) - registry changed to Bahamas
