= The Little Engine That Could (disambiguation) =

The Little Engine That Could is an illustrated children's book that was first published in 1930 by Platt & Munk.

The Little Engine That Could may also refer to:

- The Little Engine That Could (1991 film)
- The Little Engine That Could (2011 film)
- "The Little Engine That Could", a song by Burl Ives from Burl Ives Sings Little White Duck and Other Children's Favorites
