= Mississippi Queen (disambiguation) =

"Mississippi Queen" is a song by American rock band Mountain.

Mississippi Queen may also refer to:

- Mississippi Queen (steamboat), a paddle wheel driven river steamboat
- Mississippi Queen (board game), a 1997 German board game
- Mississippi Queen (bar), a Bangkok bar seen in The Deer Hunter

== See also ==
- Mississippi River
- Delta Queen
- Queen of the Mississippi (2015 ship)
- Queen of the Mississippi (2017 ship)
