= Mary Jacobs =

Mary Jacobs may refer to:

- Mary C. Jacobs (1828–1909), American horticulturalist and author
- Mary Frick Garrett Jacobs (1851–1936), Baltimore socialite, philanthropist, and art collector
