= Queen of the Mississippi (2017 ship) =

History

United States
- Name: Queen of the Mississippi
- Owner: American Cruise Lines
- Builder: Chesapeake Shipbuilding, Salisbury, Maryland
- In service: 2017
- Home port: New Orleans, Louisiana
- Status: Building

General characteristics
- Type: Overnight riverboat

Queen of the Mississippi is an overnight riverboat being built by American Cruise Lines (ACL) at Chesapeake Shipbuilding in Salisbury, Maryland for overnight river cruising on the Mississippi, Ohio, Tennessee, and Cumberland rivers in the United States. This riverboat was announced to assume the Queen of the Mississippi name after the previous ship was repositioned to the Columbia River and renamed in early 2016. However, the American Eagle quietly assumed that name in 2016 without clarification of whether this vessel will become Queen of the Mississippi in 2017 or sail under a different name.
