= Mary C. Jacobs =

American horticulturalist and author (1828–1909)

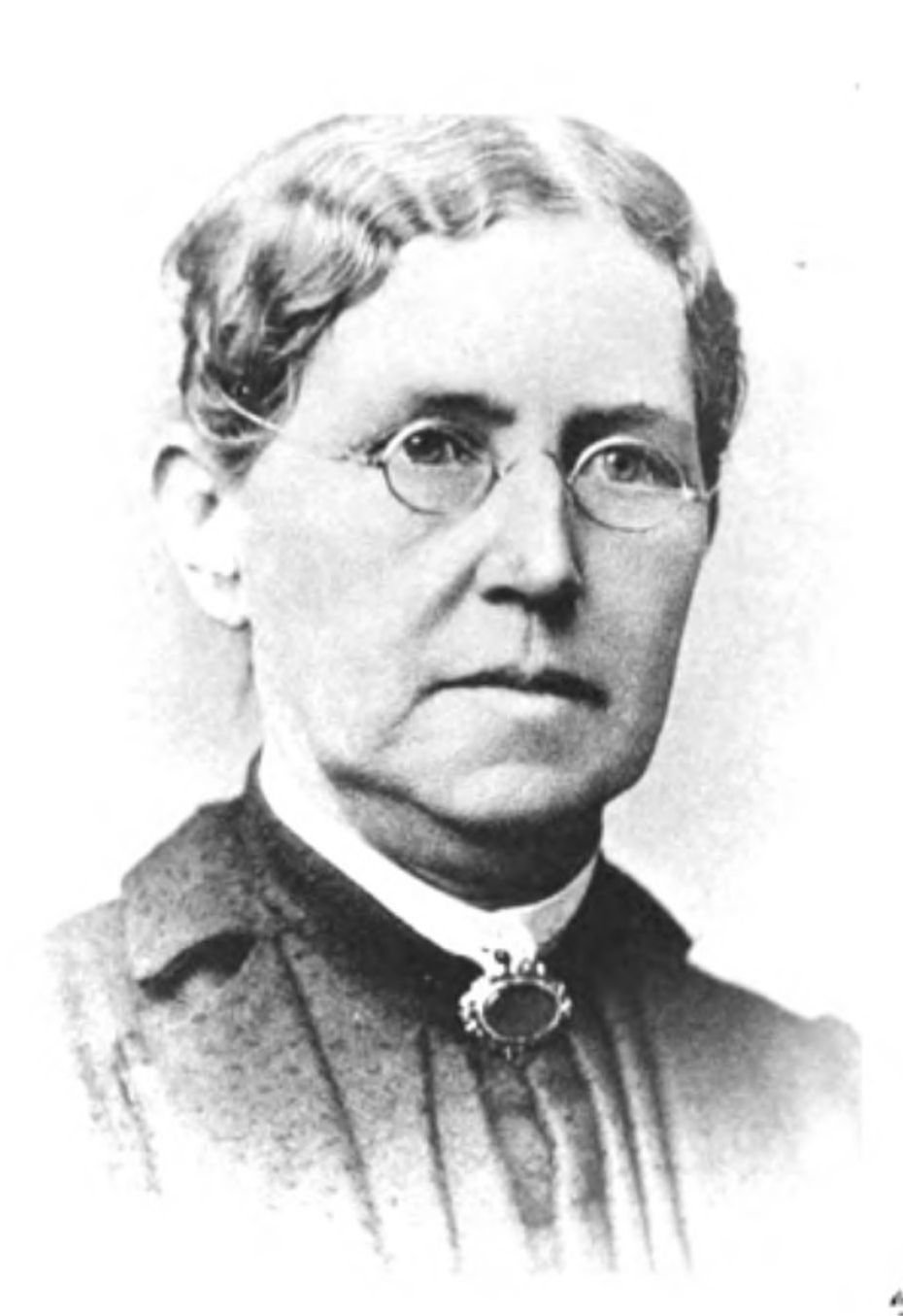
- Born: Mary Catherine Goslin; February 1, 1828; Cannon's Ferry, Woodland, Delaware, US
- Died: November 14, 1909 (aged 81)
- Other name: M. C. Jacobs
- Occupations: farmer, author
- Known for: The Pony Engine
- Spouses: Alanson Dickerson (m. 1846; died 1851) Nathaniel Ross Jacobs (m. 1855; died 1870) T. K. Jacobs (m. 1881; died 1884)
- Children: 4

Mary Catherine Goslin Jacobs (February 1, 1828 – November 14, 1909) was an American horticulturalist and author, known for her story The Pony Engine, an early published version of The Little Engine that Could.

== Early and personal life ==
Mary Catherine Goslin was born on February 1, 1828, to John Hester Goslin (née Cannon), at Cannon's Ferry in Woodland, Delaware. The family moved to Bridgeville, Delaware when she was twelve.

Jacobs was married three times, first to Alanson Dickerson (1811–1851) in 1846 and then later to Nathaniel Ross Jacobs (1822–1870) in 1855. She had four children, two from her first marriage and two, Gertrude and Lily, from her second marriage. When Jacobs died when she was forty-two, he left her deeply in debt. She was allowed to keep one-third of the family's land and thirty dollars (approximately $600 in 2021). She died on November 14, 1909, aged 81.

== The Pony Engine ==
The Pony Engine was a short story that appeared in the periodical Kindergarten Review in 1910. Jacobs' story had a footnote claiming "an illustration given in a lecture served as a basis for this little story." It was circulated widely in newspapers of the time, and versions of her story were performed in school performances.

In 1956 Arnold Munk, a New York publisher, offered prizes for people who could help him trace the origins of The Little Engine That Could. Arnold Munk was better known as Watty Piper who wrote the best-known version of the story. Mrs. Ruth L. Arthur, a school librarian from Philadelphia, won first prize for sending in a copy of Mrs. Jacobs' published version of the story.

== Farming and horticulture ==
Over ten years, she got herself out of debt and became a successful farmer, growing peaches, strawberries, and grapes, and selling dressed poultry and raising a herd of Alderney cattle. She married T. K. Jacobs in May of 1881, but he died in November 1884. She and her grown daughter who lived with her were both known as "well-read well-informed people" and both wrote poetry. She wrote several textbooks on farming.

Jacobs sided with the Confederates in the Civil War. Originally a Methodist, the she left the church when it sided with the abolitionists and joined the Episcopal Church. She sponsored an orphanage in Wilmington, Delaware and was said to have raised four of her own children and 28 other children.
