= Cruise West =

Former cruise vessel operator

Coordinates: 47.654908°N 122.380003°W

- Founded: 1973
- Founder: Chuck West
- Defunct: September 22, 2010
- Successor: Un-Cruise Adventures

Cruise West was an independent, destination focused small-ship cruise operator based in Seattle, Washington. The line was the largest operator of U.S. flagged cruise vessels (by number of vessels) with nine currently operating. They were best known for their Alaska cruises but their reach includes destinations all around the Pacific Ocean. Cruise West announced on September 18, 2010, that it is ceasing operations.

== History ==
Founded in 1973 by Chuck West, Cruise West started out as an Alaska tour operator. It wasn't until 1990 that the company purchased its first overnight vessel, the 52-passenger Spirit of Glacier Bay. Through the 1990s the company increasingly focused on cruising and expanded its fleet and added new non-Alaskan destinations such as the Columbia and Snake Rivers, British Columbia, California's wine country, and into Mexico's Sea of Cortes.

In 2001 the line acquired its first oceangoing and foreign-flagged vessel, the 114-passenger Spirit of Oceanus, a former Renaissance Cruises vessel. Cruise West expanded to Central America when they joined forces with Temptress Cruise Lines of Costa Rica to offer cruises on the 100-passenger M/V Pacific Explorer in Costa Rica and Panama.

In January 2006 Cruise West purchased the US-flagged-half of Clipper Cruise Line's fleet, the 102-passenger Nantucket Clipper and the 138-passenger Yorktown Clipper. The line renamed the vessels "Spirit of Nantucket" and Spirit of Yorktown, respectively. The Spirit of Nantucket operated on the U.S. east coast and the Great Lakes for two seasons before the line decided that it would join the rest of the fleet on the Pacific coast and be rechristened Spirit of Glacier Bay. Clipper Cruise lines has since sold off its remaining vessels and went out of business.

The line operated nine small vessels that range in capacity from 78 to 138 passengers in the Americas, South Pacific and Asia. Small-ship cruising allows for up-close and personal cruising not offered by the traditional larger cruise lines.

== Restructuring/closing ==
On September 8, 2010, the line issued a press release stating that they were restructuring under new ownership, suspended all new bookings, and had temporarily closed their reservation center.

On September 18, 2010, Cruise West announced that it will cease operations with the exception of the Sept 22 Danube Cruise. Six ships were sold off to other companies: Spirit of Oceanus, Spirit of Endeavour, Spirit of '98, Spirit of Discovery, Spirit of Alaska, Spirit of Columbia the others are most likely still waiting to be sold.

Seattle-based Un-Cruise Adventures (formerly American Safari Cruises + InnerSea Discoveries) acquired the Spirit of Endeavour, now the Safari Endeavour; and the Spirit of '98, now the S.S. Legacy. Un-Cruise Adventures offers similar small-ship cruising experiences in Alaska, Hawaiian Islands, Mexico's Sea of Cortes, the Columbia & Snake Rivers, Coastal Washington, and British Columbia.

== Safety record ==
On August 19, 2007, the Spirit of Columbia ran aground in Latouche Passage in Prince William Sound. The Captain piloted the ship too close to shore while bear viewing. The US Coast Guard sent two HH-60 helicopters, a C-130 aircraft, and the Cutter Sycamore to assist the crew to free the vessel.

The second grounding of 2007 came on November 8 when the Spirit of Nantucket, now known as the Spirit of Glacier Bay, hit an uncharted object in the Intracoastal Waterway near Virginia Beach, Virginia. Coast Guard ships from Portsmouth, Virginia, and Elizabeth City, North Carolina, as well as police and fire units from Virginia Beach, arrived to help the distressed ship.

Two additional groundings occurred in 2008, beginning with the Spirit of Alaska hitting a rock in Tracy Arm while cruising the Inside Passage of Alaska on June 4, 2008. Though the incident was minor, it did require a Coast Guard inspection and cancellation of the remainder of the cruise.

The last grounding, and by far most dramatic, involved the Spirit of Glacier Bay, formerly known as the Spirit of Nantucket. On July 7, 2008, the ship was cruising Tarr Inlet in Glacier Bay National Park when it ran aground on a silt bar. The ship was stuck for over nine hours while awaiting the incoming tide.

After the July 2008 grounding, the US Coast Guard released a statement revealing that Cruise West was part of a special program designed to review the company's safety procedures and maintenance records due to their recent string of incidents at sea.

== Fleet ==
- Spirit of Yorktown - 138 passengers - currently operated by Americana Cruises
- Pacific Explorer - 100 passengers - Owned by a Costa Rican company and operated with Cruise West branding.
- Amadeus Diamond - 148 passengers - Chartered from Lüftner Cruises of Austria.

== Former fleet ==
- Spirit of Oceanus - 120 passengers - was sold to a Danish company on September 14, 2010
- Spirit of Endeavour - 102 passengers - Sold, Current owner- Un-Cruise Adventures, renamed "Safari Endeavour"
- Spirit of '98 - 96 passengers - Sold, Current owner- Un-Cruise Adventures, renamed "Safari Legacy"- will enter service in 2013
- Spirit of Glacier Bay - 102 passengers, Renamed Chichagof Dream, Operated by Alaskan Dream Cruises (Allen Marine).
- Spirit of Discovery - 84 passengers - Sold, Current owner- Un-Cruise Adventures, renamed "Wilderness Explorer"
- Spirit of Alaska - 78 passengers - Renamed Admiralty Dream and Operated by Alaskan Dream Cruises (Allen Marine)
- Spirit of Columbia - 78 passengers - Going to start operations with the new Alaskan Dream Cruises and is to be renamed Baranof Dream

== Destinations ==
- Alaska - Including the Bering Sea with stops on Russia's Chukchi Peninsula.
- British Columbia
- Columbia and Snake Rivers
- Mexico's Gulf of California
- Central America - Including Costa Rica and Panama
- South Pacific - Including French Polynesia, Cook Islands, Samoa, Tonga, Fiji, Vanuatu, Solomon Islands, Micronesia, and Guam.
- Asia - Including Japan, Vietnam, China, and Russia's Kuril Islands and Kamchatka Peninsula.

Cruise West has also chartered vessels allowing them to offer cruises in the Galapagos Islands, Antarctica, and on the Danube River though Eastern Europe.

== See also ==
- List of cruise lines
- List of cruise ships
