= Port of New Orleans =

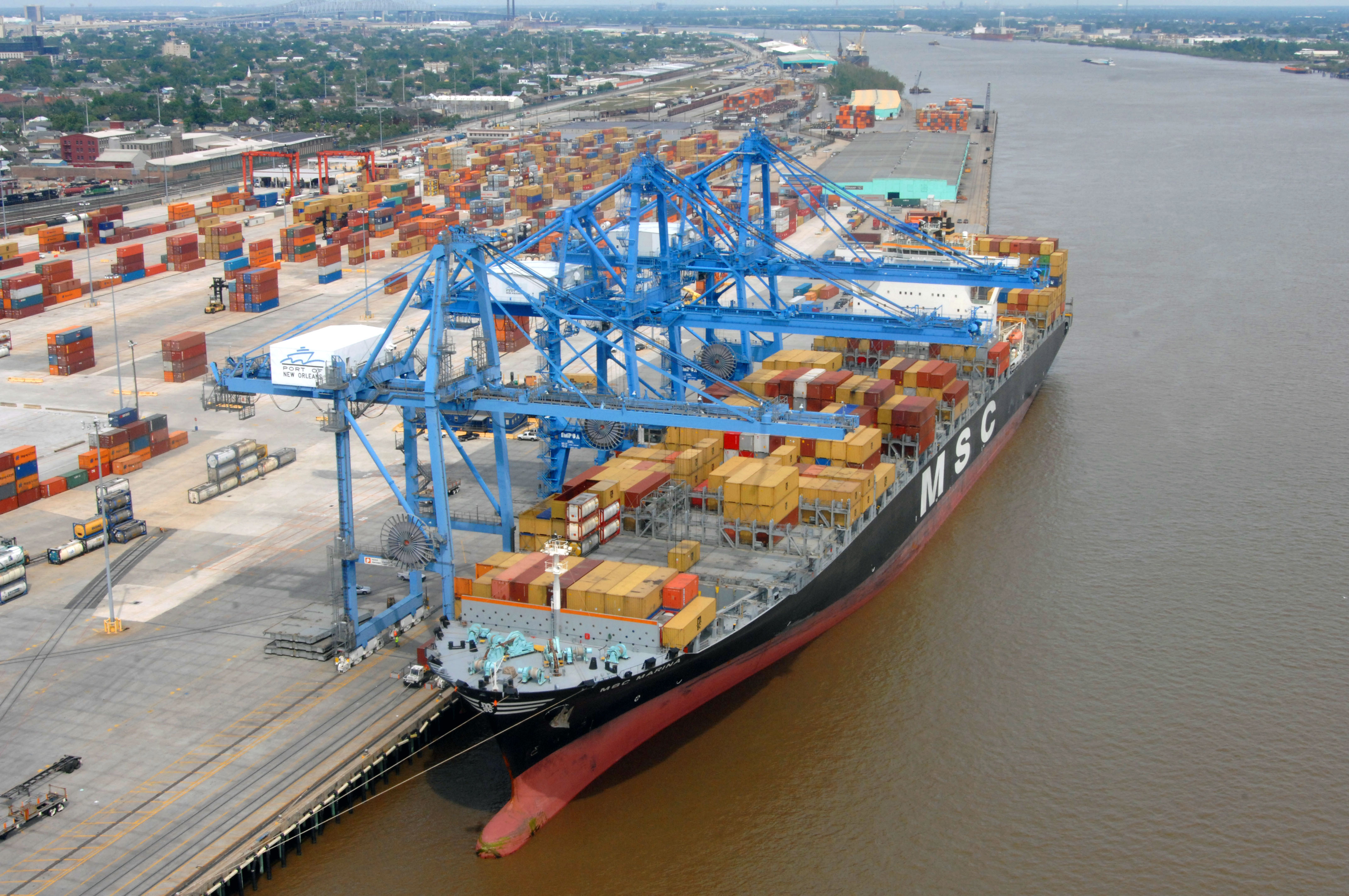
- Container ship is unloaded at the Napoleon Avenue terminal
- Interactive map of Port of New Orleans
- Location within the United States

Location
- Country: United States
- Location: New Orleans, Louisiana
- Coordinates: 29°56′13″N 90°03′43″W
- UN/LOCODE: USMSY

Details
- Draft depth: project depth 45 ft., depth at berths 50 ft.
- Air draft: 170 feet, restricted by Crescent City Connection bridge

Statistics
- Website https://www.portnola.com/

The Port of New Orleans is a significant transport hub located in Louisiana, United States. It serves as an embarkation point for cruise passengers and Louisiana’s sole international container port.

The port generates $100 million in revenue annually through its four lines of business – cargo (46%), rail (31%), cruise (16%), and industrial real estate (7%). As a self-sustaining political subdivision of the State of Louisiana, it receives zero tax dollars.

In 1946, a foreign-trade zone was established in the port. The New Orleans FTZ has more individual warehouses and sites under its umbrella than any other U.S. port-administered FTZ.

== Location ==
The Napoleon intermodal rail yard allows for containers to be transported by train.

The port is located on the Mississippi River, about 100 miles upriver from the Gulf of Mexico. It is a diverse general cargo port, handling containerized cargo such as plastic resins, food products, consumer merchandise; and breakbulk cargo such as steel, metals, rubber, wood, and paper.

== Facility investment and terminal operations ==
State, port, and private companies have invested nearly $1 billion in infrastructure and facilities at New Orleans, and another billion of investment is planned with private partnerships.

=== Containerized cargo ===
The Port of New Orleans is the only deep-water container port in Louisiana. It has an annual capacity of 840,000 TEU, with six gantry cranes to handle 10,000 TEU vessels. Four new 100-foot gauge gantry cranes were ordered spring/summer 2019 and are under construction. There are regular container-on-barge services and on-dock rail access with the Mississippi River Intermodal Terminal. The New Orleans Public Belt Railroad provides the port, partners and shippers with an on-dock intermodal advantage.

=== Breakbulk capabilities ===
There are 13,511 feet (4,118 m) of berthing space available at six dedicated breakbulk terminals, along with 1.6 million square feet (150,000 m^{2}) of transit shed area for the temporary storage of breakbulk cargo, and the ability to discharge directly to/from barge. A 140,000-square-foot dockside cold storage facility is available at the Henry Clay Avenue Refrigerated Terminal.

== Cruise terminal facilities ==
New Orleans is the sixth largest cruise port in the United States. In 2019, it had 1.20 million cruise passenger movements and 251 cruise vessel calls.

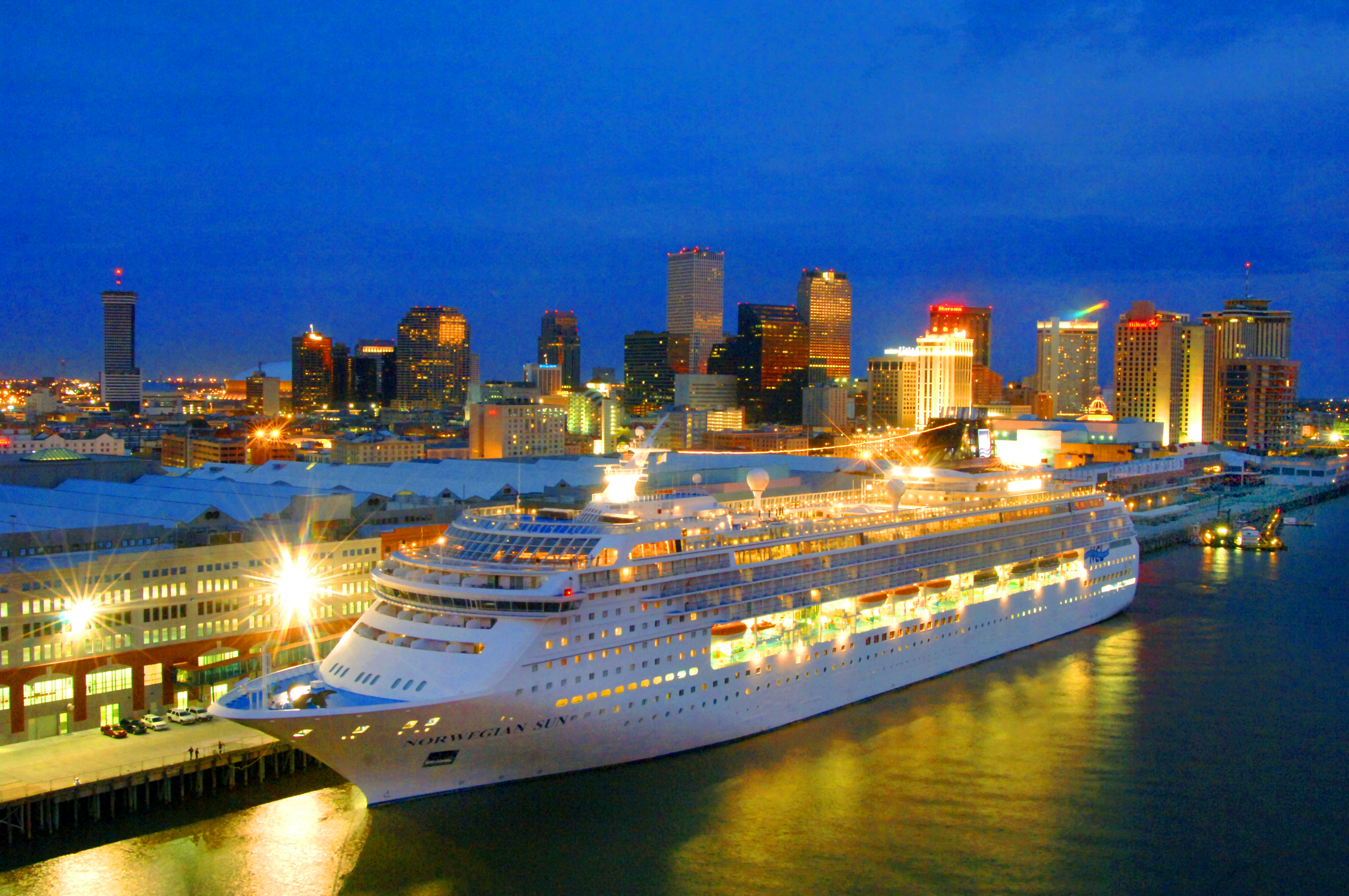
The Port of New Orleans has a cruise terminal that accommodates cruise lines such as Carnival, Norwegian, and ACL. The photograph shows the Norwegian Sun docked at the port.

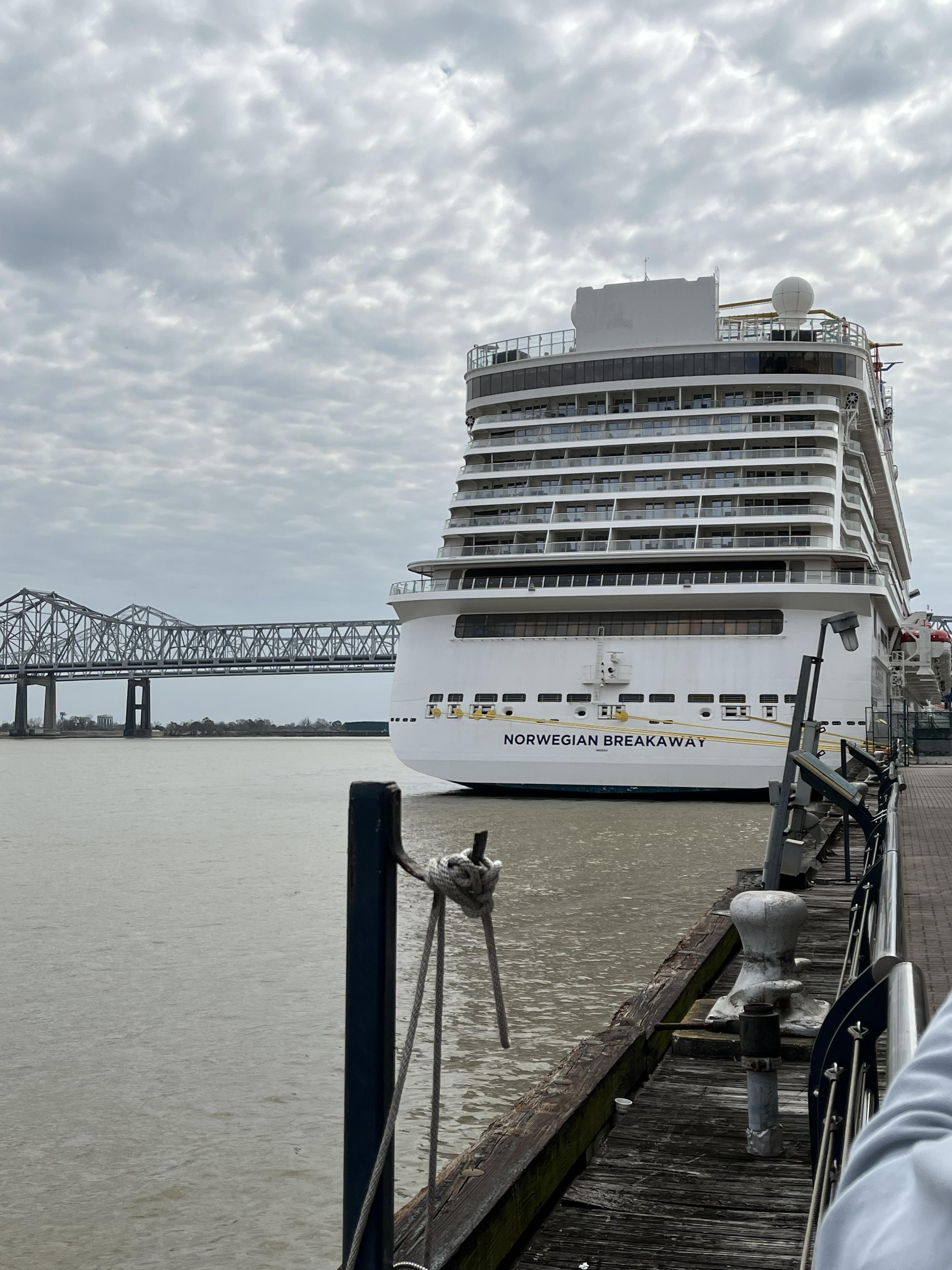
Norwegian Breakaway in the Port of New Orleans

Carnival and Norwegian sail weekly to destinations in the Eastern and Western Caribbean and Bahamas. Disney Cruise Line sailed six cruises in 2020 from New Orleans. Royal Caribbean International returned with Enchantment of the Seas in 2020 as well. Riverine cruises are a growing sector at Port NOLA. American Queen Steamboat Company and American Cruise Lines offer cruises along the coast and the nation’s inland river system.

== Governance ==
The Board of Commissioners of the Port of New Orleans governs the port. The Board sets policies and regulates traffic and commerce. It is made up of seven nonsalaried commissioners who serve five-year staggered terms. The governor of Louisiana appoints board members from a list of three nominees submitted by 19 local business, civic, labor, education, and maritime groups. The seven-person board reflects its three-parish (county) jurisdiction. Four members are selected from Orleans Parish, two from Jefferson Parish, and one from St. Bernard Parish.

=== Board members ===
- Joseph F. Toomy – Chairman
- Walter J. Leger Jr. – Vice-Chairman
- James J. Carter, Jr. – Secretary-Treasurer
- Sharonda R. Williams - Member
- Jeanne E. Ferrer - Member
- Darryl D. Berger - Member
- Todd P. Murphy - Member

=== Executive management ===
- Beth A. Branch – President and CEO
- Garri Brown - Chief People & Culture Officer
- Jean-Paul Escudier - Executive Counsel
- Matt Gresham - Chief of Governmental Relations
- Chris Gilmore - Chief Engineering Officer
- Loren Marino - Chief of Staff
- Morten Jensen - Chief Operating Officer
- Adam Laurie - Chief Financial Officer

== See also ==
- United States container ports
- New Orleans dock workers and unionization
- 2026 New Orleans ship collision, an incident within the Cruise Port where the tanker Atlantic Ashpalt collided with and capsized the American Heritage riverboat
