= Independence (cruise ship) =

Cruise ship built in 2010

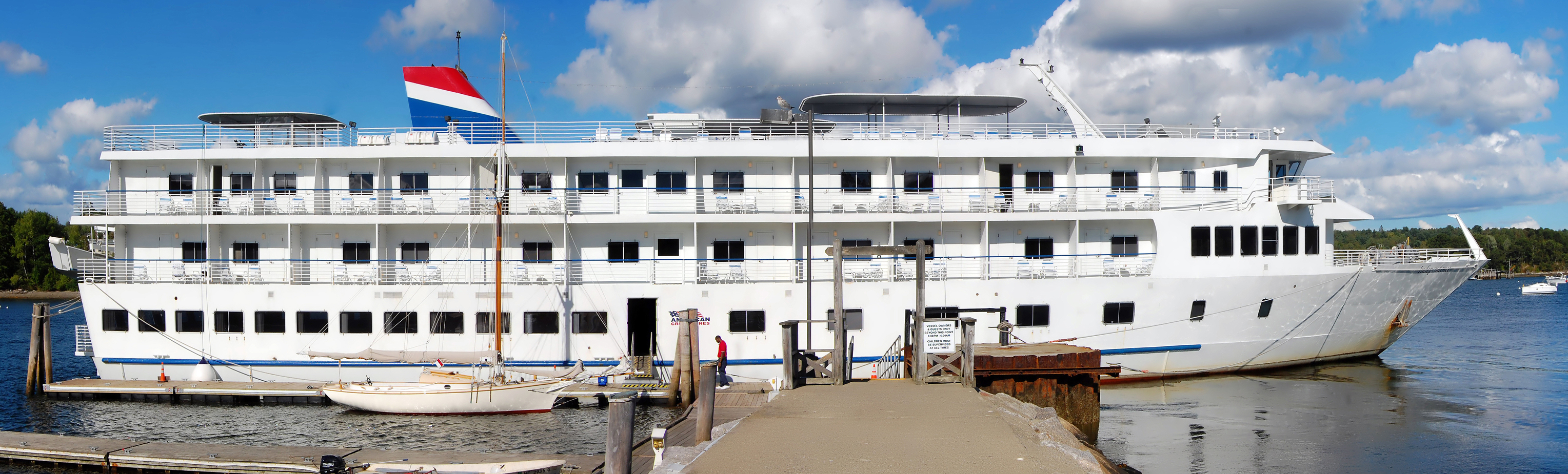

History

United States
- Name: Independence
- Owner: American Cruise Lines
- Builder: Chesapeake Shipbuilding, Salisbury, Maryland; Hull No. 90
- In service: 2010
- Homeport: Dover, Delaware
- Identification: IMO number: 9583366; MMSI number: 367438210; Call sign: WDF3297; USCG Doc. No.: 1223608
- Status: In service

General characteristics
- Type: Passenger cruise ship
- Tonnage: 3,000 GT
- Length: 171 ft (52 m)
- Beam: 39 ft (12 m)
- Complement: 104 passengers; + 27 crew

Independence is a small cruise ship owned and operated by American Cruise Lines (ACL). She was built in 2010 by Chesapeake Shipbuilding in Salisbury, Maryland for overnight coastal, river, and inland waterway cruising within the continental United States.
