= 2026 New Orleans ship collision =

Maritime incident in Louisiana, US

- The American Heritage on its side post-collision

Details
- Date: November 13, 2026 (CST; UTC−6)
- Location: New Orleans, Louisiana
- Coordinates: 29°56′13″N 90°3′39″W
- Country: United States
- Cause: Ship collision

Statistics
- Vehicles: American Heritage (sank); Atlantic Asphalt
- Deaths: 0
- Injured: 32

On November 13, 2026, the asphalt and bitumen tanker Atlantic Asphalt collided with the docked riverboat American Heritage in New Orleans, Louisiana, United States. At the time of the collision, there were at least 129 people on board. All passengers were accounted for after the crash, although at least 30 passengers and two police officers were injured. New Orleans mayor Helena Moreno and Louisiana governor Jeff Landry both labelled the rescue a "miracle on the Mississippi".

== Background ==
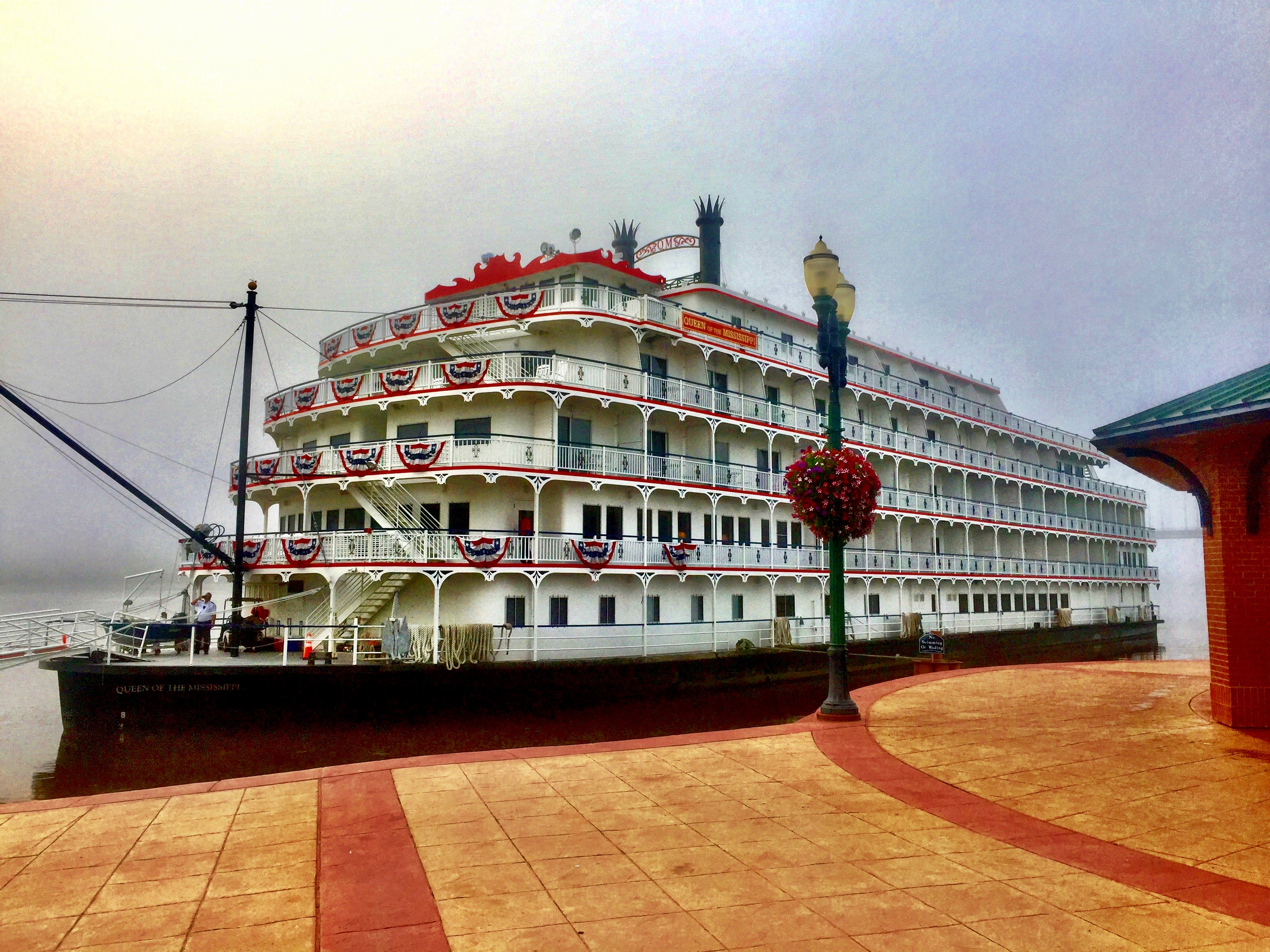
American Heritage in 2016

Atlantic Asphalt in 2019

The American Heritage is a riverboat owned by American Cruise Lines. She has a capacity of 150 passengers for overnight cruises but was carrying 197 people, both passengers and crew, at the time of the collision.

The Atlantic Asphalt is a tanker that specializes in transporting asphalt and bitumen. The tanker is owned by Nave Shipping SA, a Monrovia, Liberia, registered company that is a subsidiary of the China State Shipbuilding Corporation. At the time it struck American Heritage, it was sailing under the flag of the Marshall Islands.

== Collision ==
External videos
- Video of collision
- Video of American Heritage sinking

The collision took place at about 12:30 CST on the Mississippi River close to mile marker 96. The tanker Atlantic Asphalt struck the riverboat American Heritage while it was docked.

Several videos showed passengers and crew members in the water wearing life jackets near the location of the collision, with many other passengers climbing onto balcony railings as the ship sank. Water temperature at the time of the rescue response was reported to be about 66 °F (19 °C).

== Response ==
Emergency rescue operations were engaged at the scene by the US Coast Guard, the New Orleans Police Department, the Port of New Orleans Harbor Police Department, the New Orleans Fire Department, and several emergency medical personnel.

The US Coast Guard closed the Mississippi River to all vessel traffic between mile markers 93 and 96 amid ongoing rescue operations.

== Aftermath ==
The Port of New Orleans sued the owners and managers of Atlantic Asphalt. In court documents, the Port of New Orleans noted that the port terminal "was significantly damaged" as a result of the incident. The day after the collision, a federal judge issued a warrant allowing federal officials to take control of the Atlantic Asphalt.

== See also ==
- MV Bright Field – a ship that collided with Riverwalk Marketplace in New Orleans in 1996
- MV George Prince ferry disaster – a Luling–Destrehan Ferry which collided with the Norwegian tanker SS Frosta in 1976
- USCGC Blackthorn
