= Tina Fallon =

American politician (1917–2011)

- Evelyn Peele (Tina Fallon), from the 1938 yearbook of Meredith College

Member of the Delaware House of Representatives from the 39th district
- In office 1978 – November 8, 2006
- Preceded by: Thomas A. Temple
- Succeeded by: Daniel Short

Personal details
- Born: Evelyn Kilton Peele; September 16, 1917 Brogden, North Carolina, U.S.
- Died: January 27, 2011 (aged 93) California, U.S.
- Party: Republican
- Profession: Teacher, Politician

Tina Fallon (September 16, 1917 – January 27, 2011), born Evelyn Kilton Peele, was an American politician who served in the Delaware House of Representatives for the 39th district from 1978 until her retirement in 2006. Before serving in the legislature, Fallon was a teacher in the Seaford area. In 2007, the Woodland Ferry was named The Tina Fallon in honor of the former representative.

== Biography ==
Fallon was born in Brogden, North Carolina, the daughter of George Peele and Lillian Langston Peele. She graduated from Meredith College in Raleigh in 1938. She earned a master's degree from the University of Delaware.

Fallon was a math and science teacher. She was president of the Seaford Education Association. She served in the Delaware House of Representatives for almost thirty years, from 1978 until she retired in 2006. She was assigned to the Education, Natural Resources, and Agriculture committees in her first term, the Business/Corporations/Commerce committee in 1999, and the Appropriations committee in 2001. Concerns were raised about her age in her later terms; she replied in 1998 that "I am 80 and bragging about it. Age brings advantages. If you have good health, the time, the energy and the information, age is no distraction."

Peele married fellow teacher James Dominic Fallon Jr. in 1938. They had four sons. Her husband died in 1982. Fallon died on January 27, 2011, at the age of 93, at an assisted living home in California. Flags in the state were flown at half-mast in her memory. The Woodland Ferry was renamed The Tina Fallon in her honor in 2007, and she attended the new ferry's christening ceremony in 2008. A historical marker was placed at the site in 2012.
