= The Little Engine That Could (1991 film) =

- VHS cover
- Directed by: Dave Edwards
- Screenplay by: Ray Rhamey
- Based on: The Little Engine; That Could (1930) by Arnold Munk a.k.a. Watty Piper (1888–1957)
- Produced by: Mike Young; Dave Edwards
- Starring: Kath Soucie; Frank Welker; B. J. Ward; Neil Ross; Bever-Leigh Banfield; Peter Cullen; Scott Menville; Billy O'Sullivan; Dina Sherman
- Edited by: Terry Brown
- Music by: Ben Heneghan; Ian Lawson
- Production company: S4C; Kalato Animation; Dave Edwards Studio
- Distributed by: MCA/Universal Home Video
- Release dates: January 1, 1991 (U.K.); November 22, 1991 (U.S.)
- Running time: 29 minutes
- Countries: United Kingdom; United States
- Language: English

The Little Engine That Could is a 1991 animated adventure-film for children directed by Dave Edwards and co-produced by Edwards and Mike Young, animated at Kalato Animation in Wales and co-financed by Universal Pictures through their MCA/Universal Home Video arm and the S4C, Wales' dedicated Welsh-language channel.

It did premiere on January 1, 1991, in the United Kingdom, and on April 2, 1991, in Ireland. It was released on VHS in the United States on November 22, 1991, by MCA/Universal Home Video, and it was also syndicated in the United States on broadcast television as an Easter special in March/April in 1993.

The film features the voice talents of Kath Soucie and Frank Welker. It is based on the 1930 book of the same name, by Watty Piper (specifically based on the 1976 illustrations by Ruth Sanderson).

== Plot ==
Eric, a young boy, is excited about his birthday after reading a book and believes that a birthday train will come for him, much to his teenage sister Jill's disbelief. Opposite from their town on the other side of a mountain, the engines at a roundhouse wake up and are assigned jobs by Tower. Farnsworth and Pete each pull a passenger train and a freight train over the mountain to the town; Jebediah is assigned the milk train; and Georgia is assigned the birthday train, which is being loaded by Rollo the clown. Tillie, a switcher engine, wishes to pull a train of her own but is denied permission by the Tower due to her small size.

Georgia breaks down shortly after departing the station and is taken back to the roundhouse. With the birthday train stranded, Rollo and the others attempt to flag down a substitute engine; Farnsworth, Pete, and Jebediah each pass by and decline their request. Tillie sneaks out from the roundhouse after Tower falls asleep and offers her help. Tillie, repeating "I think I can", pulls the birthday train up the mountain and endures ridicule from various animals. Tillie narrowly crosses a collapsing bridge but loses the last train car.

Tillie reaches the summit but is knocked out after an avalanche buries her and the train. When she regains consciousness from her heart-shaped firebox, Tillie pulls the train out of the snow using her cowcatcher as a snowplow. The train descends the mountain and reaches the town in celebration, to Eric's delight and Jill's amazement: Tillie expresses pride for finishing the journey and uses her whistle to summon the town's children to enjoy the birthday train's festivities.

== Voice cast ==
- Kath Soucie as Tillie / Missy
- Frank Welker as Farnsworth / Jebediah / Rollo / Perky / Eagle
- B. J. Ward as Grumpella
- Neil Ross as Doc / Tower / Handy Pandy
- Bever-Leigh Banfield as Georgia
- Peter Cullen as Pete
- Scott Menville as Chip / Stretch
- Billy O'Sullivan as Eric
- Dina Sherman as Jill

=== Uncredited ===
- Kath Soucie as Little Wolf
- Frank Welker as Jeepers / Big Wolf
- Peter Cullen as The Cave

== Broadcast history ==
Despite being released as a direct-to-video film, The Little Engine That Could had been broadcast on 56 independent television stations as an Easter special for only two weeks and two years later.

== See also ==
- The Little Engine That Could – the 1930 book upon which it is based.
- The Little Engine That Could (2011 film) – 2011 CGI film starring Alyson Stoner.
