= The Little Engine That Could =

American children's tale

The Little Engine That Could by Watty Piper (1930)

The Little Engine That Could is an American folktale and story to teach children the value of optimism and hard work. It is best known for its signature motif: "I think I can!"

The story originated in the early 20th century being retold by various authors, including Mary C. Jacobs. It was first referred to as its well known title in a 1920 edition published within the My Book House series. The most widely known version by Arnold "Watty Piper" Munk was published in 1930 by Platt & Munk. The 1930 version entered the American public domain on January 1, 2026.

== Plot ==
In the tale, a long train must be pulled over a high mountain after its locomotive breaks down. Larger locomotives, treated anthropomorphically, are asked to pull the train; for various reasons, they refuse because they think they are too important (or in the old engine’s case, because he can’t due to his age). The request is sent to a small engine, who agrees to try. Despite the steep climb and heavy load, the engine slowly succeeds in pulling the train over the mountain while repeating the motto: "I think I can".

== Background ==
"Story of the Engine That Thought It Could"
A 2011 reading of "Story of the Engine That Thought It Could" (1906, Rev. Charles S. Wing) (2 min 23 sec)

The story's signature phrases such as "I think I can" first occurred in print in a 1902 article in a Swedish journal. An early published version of the story, "Story of the Engine That Thought It Could", appeared in the New-York Tribune on April 8, 1906, as part of a sermon by the Rev. Charles S. Wing.

"Thinking One Can"
A 2011 reading of "Thinking One Can" (1906, unattributed) (1 min 37 sec)

A brief version of the tale appeared under the title "Thinking One Can" in 1906, in Wellspring for Young People, a Sunday school publication. This version reappeared in a 1910 book, Foundation Stones of Success.

"The Pony Engine"
A 2011 reading of "The Pony Engine" (1910, Mary C. Jacobs) (2 min 45 sec)

Another version was published under the name "The Pony Engine" in the Kindergarten Review in 1910, written by Mary C. Jacobs. A different version with the same title appeared in a magazine for children in 1916 under the name of Mabel C. Bragg, a teacher. She introduced new events to the story, such as the train's kid-friendly cargo, but she "took no credit for originating the story".

The first version with the title "The Little Engine That Could" appeared in 1920 in the U.S., in Volume 1 of My Book House, a set of books sold door-to-door. This version is the first instance of the engine being referred to by gender, as female. This version began: "Once there was a Train-of-Cars; she was flying across the country with a load of Christmas toys for the children who lived on the other side of the mountain". The story was labeled, as told by Olive Beaupré Miller, that the first edition gave credit to Bragg, but subsequent editions did not as Miller subsequently concluded that "the story belonged to the realm of folk literature". Miller was the founding editor and publisher of The Book House for Children, a company based in Chicago.

The best known incarnation of The Little Engine That Could was published in 1930 by "Watty Piper", pen name of Arnold Munk, who was the owner of the publishing firm Platt & Munk. The title page stated: "Retold by Watty Piper from The Pony Engine by Mabel C. Bragg's copyrighted by George H. Doran and Co." Munk used the name Watty Piper as both an author of children's books and as the editor of many of the books that Platt & Munk published. He personally hired Lois Lenski to illustrate the book.

1954 edition front cover of the book

In 1954, Platt & Munk published another version of The Little Engine That Could with slightly revised language and new, more colorful illustrations by George and Doris Hauman. Although there had been many previous editions of this classic story, "it was the work of George and Doris Hauman that earned The Little Engine the title of being worthy to sit on the same shelf as Alice's Adventures in Wonderland". A 1976 reworking that featured art by Ruth Sanderson received a lot of attention at the time of its release, in part because it prompted a discussion of gender stereotypes.

== Films ==
The 1963 film The Little Engine That Could, by Coronet Films, was the first adaption of the story.

The story was adapted for a second time in January 1991 as a 30-minute animated film produced in the United Kingdom and co-financed in the United Kingdom and the United States. It features the voices of Kath Soucie, Frank Welker, and Peter Cullen.

In March 2011, the story was adapted for a third time as a CGI film named The Little Engine That Could, produced by Universal Studios and featuring the voices of Whoopi Goldberg, Jamie Lee Curtis, Alyson Stoner, and Corbin Bleu.

== Song ==
Burl Ives recorded the story told as a song written by Gerald Marks and Milton Pascal with an orchestra directed by Percy Faith. It was released on the album Burl Ives Sings Little White Duck and Other Children's Favorites in 1964.

== "Little Engine" toys and rail tours ==
From 2005 to 2008, a full-size replica of the Little Engine That Could made an annual circuit around the United States. Arranged through Rail Events, Inc., a number of tourist and museum railroad operations hosted the "I Think I Can" Rail Tour. The replica was constructed in 2005 by the Strasburg Rail Road in southeast Pennsylvania who also constructed the Thomas the Tank Engine replicas that tour the United States. The last tour was in 2008. In 2009, the replica only appeared at the Texas State Railroad. In 2011, the website for the tour said that there would be dates announced for that year, but dates were never posted and the message was still present in 2012 until it went offline. The last time the train ever operated was on September 16, 2012. As of 2015, the replica is owned by the Great Smoky Mountains Railroad, and has since been repainted to remove all references to the Little Engine That Could. It is currently displayed at the depot.

== List of other Little Engine That Could books ==
- The Little Engine That Could and the Big Chase
- I Knew You Could!
- Three Little Engines

== Legacy ==
A 1949 recording of the story by Paul Wing was inducted to the National Recording Registry in 2009.

Based on a 2007 online poll, the National Education Association listed the book as one of its "Teachers' Top 100 Books for Children".

The Little Engine That Could is the first book sent to children enrolled in Dolly Parton's Imagination Library book program. The 90th anniversary edition of the book, published by Penguin Random House, includes an introduction by Dolly Parton and illustrations by Caldecott Award-Winner Dan Santat.

== See also ==
- The Little Engine That Could – the 1991 film adaptation of the book
- The Little Engine That Could – the 2011 computer-animated film starring Alyson Stoner
- Dumbo – the 1941 film that incorporates the story around the Casey Jr. Circus Train
- The Easter Bunny Is Comin' to Town – 1977 stop-motion animated special that incorporates the story
- Thomas the Tank Engine – a similar British character
