= Burl Ives Sings Little White Duck and Other Children's Favorites =

Studio album by Burl Ives
- Released: 1959
- Genre: Children's
- Length: 32:33
- Label: Harmony Records

Burl Ives Sings Little White Duck and Other Children's Favorites is a 12-inch LP album of folk songs for children recorded by Burl Ives (vocal and guitar) for Columbia Records between 1949 and 1951. The label, in 1950, crafted a "shared" 10-inch children's LP.

On side one, Hollywood actor Victor Jory narrated Tubby the Tuba, while side two featured Burl Ives performing seven tunes under the title Animal Fair: Songs for Children. The catalog number was JL 8103. One year earlier, Animal Fair: Songs for Children had been presented separately on a two-disc 78-rpm set, using as a catalog number MJV 59.

In 1956, another Ives endeavor for children appeared, containing "The Little White Duck" and six other ditties. Part of Columbia's brief (1955–56) House Party Series of 10-inch LPs, the album was called Children's Favorites, affixed with the catalog number CL 2570. Next, a new collection, expanded to 12 inches, combining these 14 Ives selections and 2 additional ones and entitled Burl Ives Sings Songs for All Ages, was issued by Columbia in 1957, bearing CL 980 as the catalog number. Two years later, this album was shortened by two tracks, christened with its final title, Burl Ives Sings Little White Duck and Other Children's Favorites, and reassigned to Columbia's budget label, Harmony Records, which employed HL 9507 as the catalog number.

Being the customary practice in the vinyl marketplace of the 60s, this monaural platter wound up electronically enhanced for stereo, circa 1963, and given the modified catalog number HS 14507. Columbia, in 1974, reissued the LP, again in simulated stereo, with the catalog number C 33183.

At the same time, the label also transferred the album to cassette tape, affixing the catalog number CT 33183. On November 22, 1988, Columbia released the album in CD format, which upgraded the sound quality to digital stereo. Distribution of the disc was then taken over by Sony Wonder on October 3, 1995.

The 1974 LP cover, later retained for the CD, was designed by Ed Lee and Eloise Smith, with illustrations by Reynolds Ruffin. All the album tracks are now available via MP3 downloading.

== Track listing ==
1. "The Little White Duck" (Walt Barrows, Bernard Zaritsky) – 2:31
2. "The Little Engine That Could" (Gerald Marks, Milton Pascal) – 2:42
3. "Mr. Froggie Went A-Courtin'" (Burl Ives, Tony Mottola) – 3:06
4. "The Donut Song" (Bob Merrill) – 2:59
5. "Two Little Owls" – 1:50
6. "Fooba Wooba John" (John Francis Kane, Mark Walmsley) – 1:09
7. "The Grey Goose" (Hecky Krasnow) – 3:03
8. "The Whale" (Hecky Krasnow) – 1:33
9. "Buckeye Jim" – 1:34
10. "The Sow Took the Measles" – 1:50
11. "The Goat and the Train" – 1:21
12. "Mr. Rabbit" – 1:38
13. "The Tailor and the Mouse" (Burl Ives) – 1:16
14. "Mother Goose Songs" (arranged and edited by Hecky Krasnow) – 6:01
