= Woodland Ferry =

Historic house in Delaware, United States

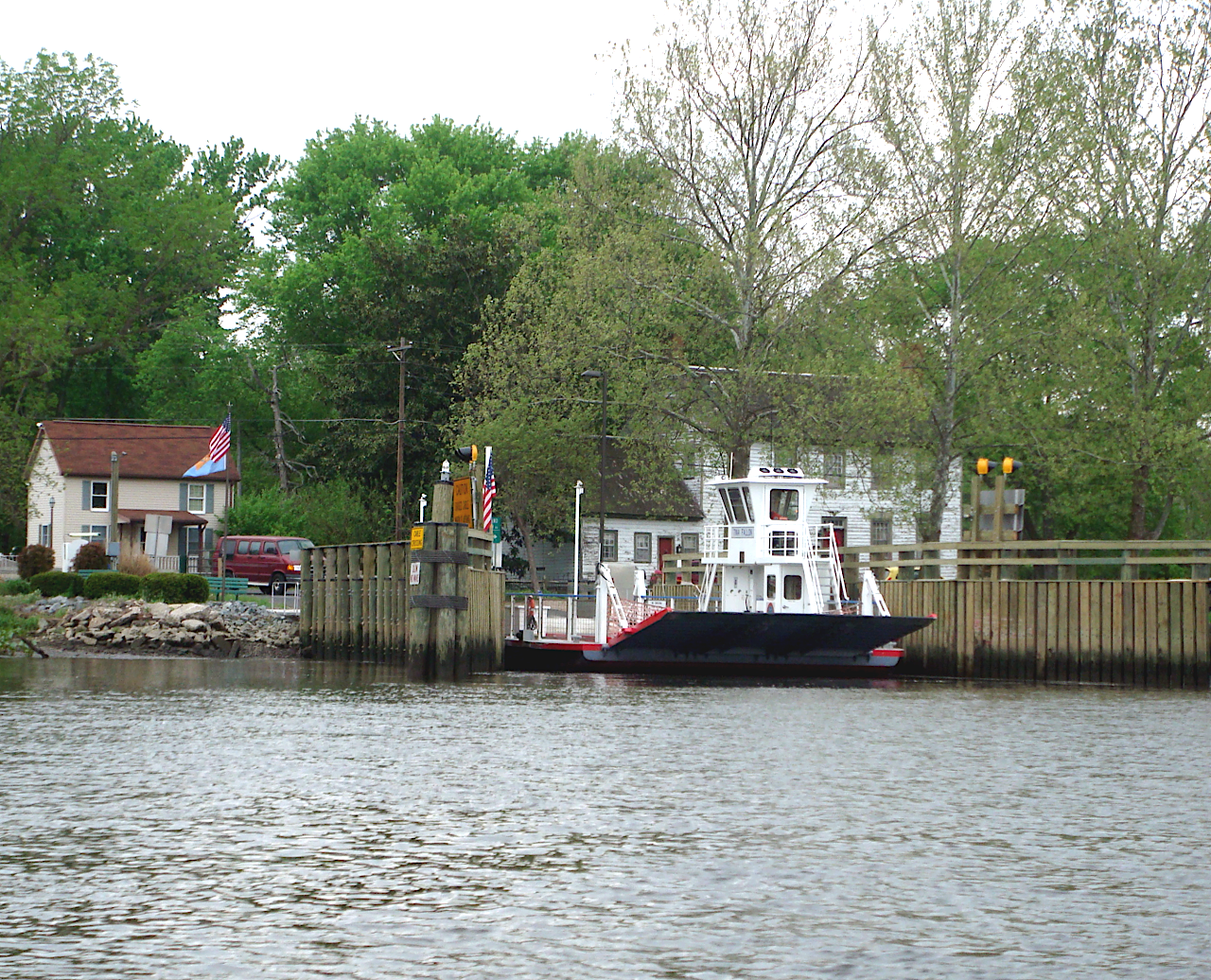
- Woodland Ferry vessel, the Tina Fallon, May 2009; Cannon Hall to the right in background
- Locale: West of Seaford, Delaware
- Waterway: Nanticoke River
- Transit type: Passenger and automobile cable ferry
- Owner
- Cannon's Ferry
- U.S. National Register of Historic Places
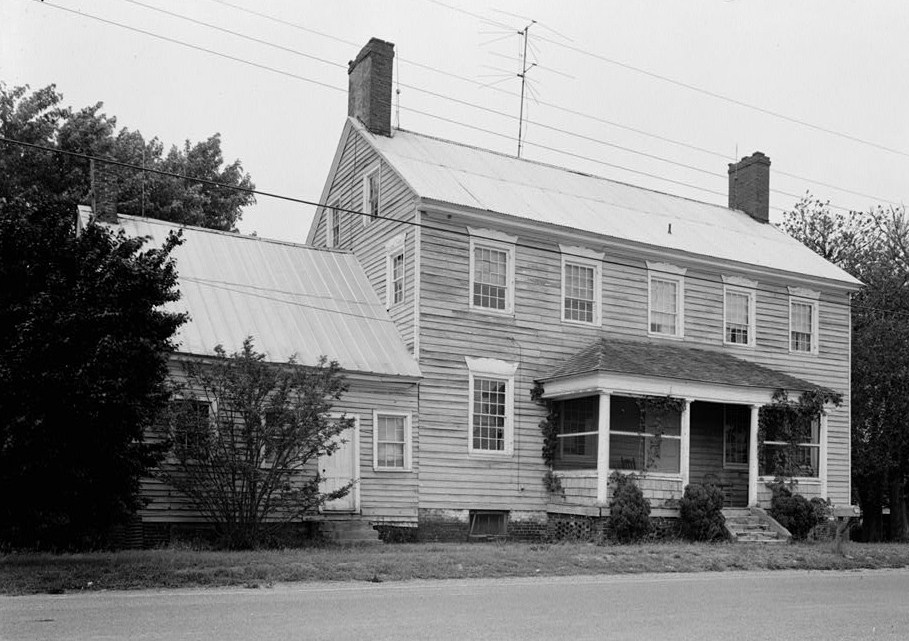
- Cannon Hall, HABS Photo, May 1960

- Location within Delaware Location within the United States
- Location: Across the Nanticoke River, Woodland, Delaware
- Coordinates: 38°36′0″N 75°39′25″W
- Area: 5 acres (2.0 ha)
- Built: c. 1810
- Architectural style: Georgian
- NRHP reference No.: 73000561
- Added to NRHP: July 2, 1973
- Operator: Delaware Department of Transportation
- Began operation: 1740s
- No. of lines: 1
- No. of terminals: 2

The Woodland Ferry, historically known as Cannon's Ferry, is a cable ferry located in western Sussex County, Delaware, United States, spanning the Nanticoke River at Woodland, Delaware, west of the city of Seaford. The ferry is operated year-round by the Delaware Department of Transportation. It is closed on national holidays of Christmas, Thanksgiving, and New Year's Day, and also as required by weather.

== History ==
The ferry is one of the oldest, if not the oldest, ferries in continuous operation in the United States. In addition to its longevity, the ferry is of historical importance as one of the locations where slave runner Patty Cannon embarked with kidnapped refugee slaves and free blacks. She shipped them to Georgia where the free blacks were sold into slavery and refugee slaves returned to servitude.

The Ferry was established in the 1740s by James Cannon, and operated by his son Jacob after his death. After Jacob's death in 1793, his widow petitioned the Delaware General Assembly for exclusive rights to operate a ferry service across the river. The ferry was privately operated by the Cannon family until the mid-19th century, when the General Assembly authorized the county to operate a free ferry at the location of "Cannon's Ferry".

In 1935, the Delaware Department of Transportation assumed responsibility for the operation of the ferry and has continued to operate it into the 21st century.

== National Register of Historic Places listing ==
Cannon's Ferry is a historic home and cable ferry added to the National Register of Historic Places in 1973. Cannon Hall was built about 1810, and is a two-story, five-bay, single-pile frame dwelling in the Georgian style. It has a small frame wing attached to the west end of the main house. It has a central hall plan and interior end chimneys. The property also includes the ferry landing site. At least since 1793, and perhaps longer, a public ferry has crossed the river here. It is the last cable ferry in Delaware.

== Woodland Ferry vessel, the Tina Fallon ==
The 65-foot-long Tina Fallon was put into service in 2007, replacing the 65-foot-long Virginia C. The Virginia C, which can transport up to three vehicles at a time, was sold at auction in February 2008.

The Tina Fallon was constructed by Chesapeake Shipbuilding of Salisbury, Maryland at a cost of $931,000 and can carry six vehicles at a time. The site work was completed by George and Lynch of New Castle, Delaware. The total cost for the project was approximately 3.2 million dollars, including the $931,000 for the ferry, $1.8 million for new docks and $500,000 for permits, security cameras and lighting. The new ferry was named after Tina Fallon, a long-time Delaware state representative from Seaford.

== Woodland Ferry Festival ==
The Woodland Ferry Festival is held every September in Seaford to celebrate the ferry and its contribution to local culture.
