= Woodland, Delaware =

Unincorporated community in Delaware, United States

- Unincorporated community
- Location within Delaware Location within the United States
- Coordinates: 38°36′00″N 75°39′29″W
- Country: United States
- State: Delaware
- County: Sussex
- Elevation: 3 ft (0.91 m)
- Time zone: UTC-5 (Eastern (EST))
  - Summer (DST): UTC-4 (EDT)
- Area code: 302
- GNIS feature ID: 216257

Woodland is an unincorporated community in Sussex County, Delaware, United States. Woodland is located on the Nanticoke River, 3.8 miles (6.1 km) southwest of Seaford. Cannon's Ferry, which is listed on the National Register of Historic Places, is located in Woodland and is also known as the Woodland Ferry.
