= Queen of the West =

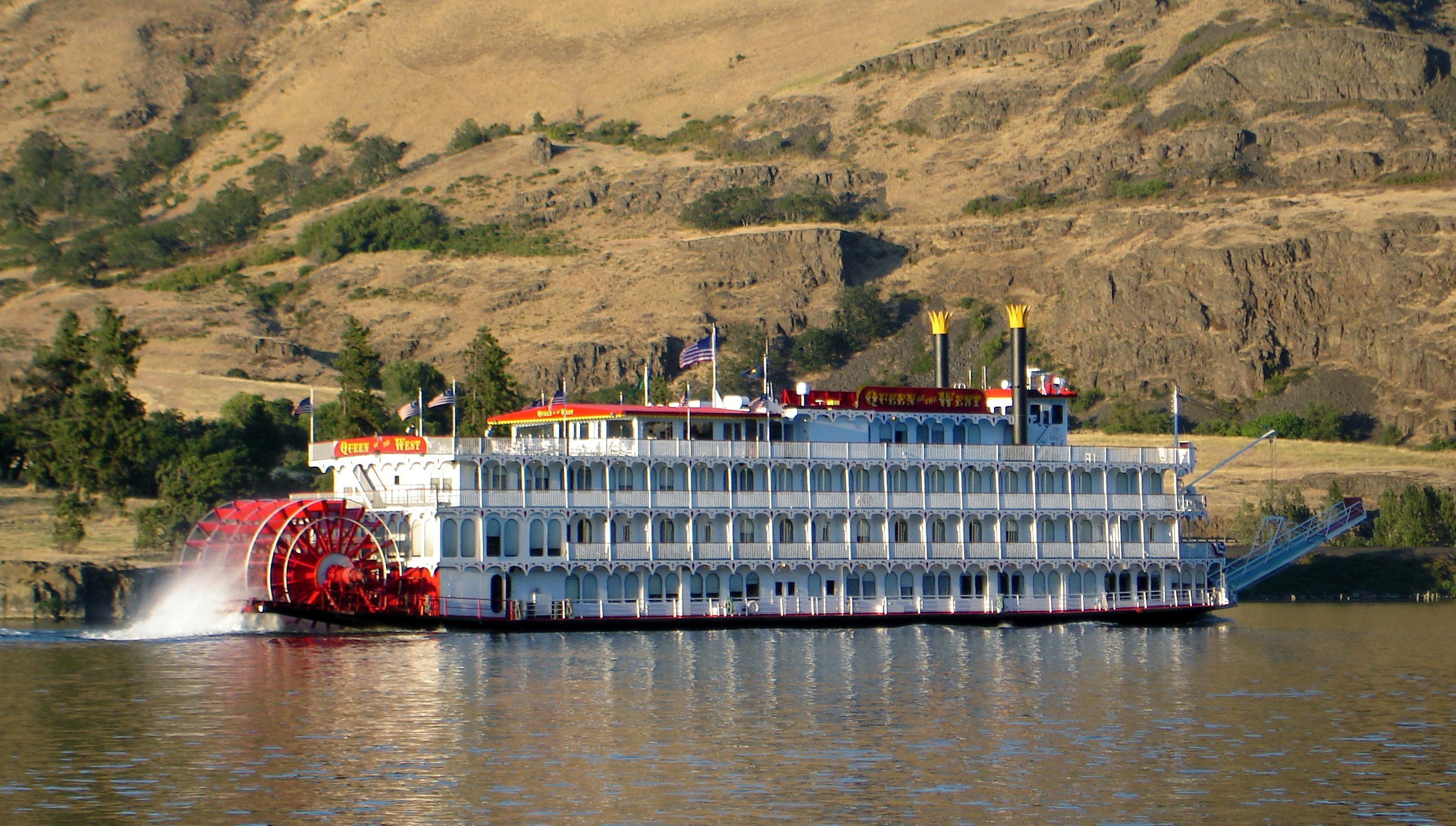
- The sternwheeler Queen of the West, a 1995-built replica steamboat, on the Columbia River near Hood River, Oregon.

History

United States
- Name: Queen of the West
- Owner: American Cruise Lines
- Builder: Nichols Bros. Boat Builders - Freeland WA, USA. Hull S-110.
- In service: 1995
- Home port: Portland, Oregon
- Identification: IMO number: 8642957; MMSI number: 367452710; Callsign: WDF4506
- Status: In service

General characteristics
- Type: Overnight riverboat
- Tonnage: 2,115 gt
- Length: 232 ft (71 m)
- Beam: 50 ft (15 m)
- Draft: 7 ft (2.1 m)
- Propulsion: Main Engines: 2 x 12V396MTU diesels @ 1750 HP each, Auxiliary Engines: 2 x 500 KW each
- Speed: 12 knots (22 km/h; 14 mph)
- Complement: 120 passengers currently, 167 as built

Queen of the West is a stern-driven paddle wheel riverboat originally built in 1995 at Nichols Bros. Boat Builders for the American West Steamboat Company for overnight river cruising on the Columbia & Snake Rivers within the United States. She is currently owned and operated by American Cruise Lines. The Queen of the West originally carried up to 167 passengers, but now carries 120 following her 2011 refurbishment for ACL. The ship has 67 cabins spread over 4 decks.

On August 4, 2015, ACL announced that Queen of the West would be joined by her 150-passenger sister ship, American Pride, on the Columbia in early 2016.

== See also ==
- Tourist sternwheelers of Oregon
