= The Little Engine That Could (2011 film) =

2011 American film by Elliot M. Bour

- DVD cover
- Directed by: Elliot M. Bour
- Screenplay by: David Koepp; John Kamps; Cliff Ruby; Elana Lesser
- Story by: David Koepp; John Kamps
- Based on: the book by Watty Piper
- Produced by: Richard Rich
- Starring: Alyson Stoner; Whoopi Goldberg; Patrick Warburton; Jim Cummings; Rodney Saulsberry; Dominic Scott Kay; Brenda Song; Jamie Lee Curtis; Charlie Schlatter; Jodi Benson; Corbin Bleu; Jeff Bennett; Khamani Griffin
- Edited by: Joe Campana
- Music by: Heitor Pereira
- Production companies: Universal Animation Studios; Crest Animation
- Distributed by: Universal Pictures Home Entertainment
- Release date: March 22, 2011
- Running time: 82 minutes
- Country: United States
- Language: English

The Little Engine That Could is a 2011 American direct-to-video animated adventure film based on the 1930 story by Watty Piper (specifically based on the 2005 illustrations by Loren Long). The film stars the voices of Alyson Stoner, Whoopi Goldberg, Corbin Bleu, Jodi Benson, Patrick Warburton and Jamie Lee Curtis.

== Plot ==
In the magical world of Dream Land, Little Engine is a small shunter who wishes to become a Dream Hauler, responsible for delivering wishes and dreams to the Real World. Encouraged by the old but wise Rusty, Little Engine continues to aspire to greater things.

In the Real World, a boy named Richard has his grandfather's pocket watch stolen by school bullies Scott and Stretch. Running away to the local park, he gets inside a train, unaware that it is Rusty who departs for Dream Land. Richard's accidental arrival causes the tunnel between worlds to collapse, stranding him and the trains. The Tower demotes Rusty to a track-cleaner, much to Little Engine's dismay. Learning from Rusty about an ancient route over Dream Mountain, she asks to return Richard to the Real World in exchange for Rusty being reinstated. The Tower agrees, although she is likely kidding.

After setting out and nearly getting run over by the high-speed Evening Express, Little Engine and Richard soon encounter Engine 35's birthday present train, which was derailed due to the tunnel collapse: With the larger engines digging it out refusing to believe the old tracks exist, Little Engine, Richard, and the toys aboard the birthday train decide to continue alone. The group locates the old tracks and begins climbing Dream Mountain. Crossing a rickety wooden bridge, part of the structure collapses, puncturing a hole in Little Engine's water tank. By using a nearby pole to replace the broken rail, they finish crossing.

That night, Little Engine's leaking water tank leaves her stranded. A dark gray steam locomotive suddenly appears out of nowhere and offers to take Richard and the toys to the Real World, after which he is revealed to be the Nightmare Train and kidnaps Little Engine's friends. Ace the airplane escapes and helps Little Engine refill her tank at a nearby water tower. Richard manages to escape as well and reunites with Little Engine, who pursues the Nightmare Train and rescues the others. With great effort, she climbs to the mountain's peak, reaching the portal to the Real World. The toys are delivered, and almost no time has passed when Richard returns to his school.

After bidding farewell to Little Engine, Richard finally stands up to Scott and Stretch, reclaiming his grandfather's watch. The bullies are punished by the principal, while Richard heads home and decides to keep his adventure in Dream Land a secret. Meanwhile, the tunnel gets restored, Little Engine is promoted to a Dream Hauler, Rusty is reinstated and honored with a ticker tape parade, and the toys find new homes and five new owners in the Real World. The Nightmare Train, defeated, is left derailed on a snowbank.

== Voice cast ==
- Alyson Stoner as The Little Engine, a steam shunter engine who dreams of being a Dream Hauler and becomes close friends with Richard
- Whoopi Goldberg as Tower, a control tower who is in charge of everyone in the train yard
- Patrick Warburton as Caboose, a red caboose who is part of the birthday train
- Jeff Bennett as Red Engine, the red #35 Dream Hauler
  - Bennett also voices Hudson, a green and white sock monkey with a British accent who serves as the vice leader of the toys and Little Engine's fireman
- Mocean Melvin as Big Locomotive, a silver streamlined Dream Hauler with purple and orange stripes
- Jim Cummings as Rusty, a senior Dream Hauler and friend to Little Engine
  - Cummings also voices the Evening Express, a white streamlined Dream Hauler who pulls a fast express
- Rodney Saulsberry as Freight Train, a green and orange Dream Hauler who hauls heavy freight trains
  - Saulsberry also voices Bud, a toy giraffe. He is much less talkative compared to Lou and does not speak until near the end of the film.
- Brenda Song as Shiny Passenger Train, a yellow Dream Hauler who is very full of herself. She is one of many who was sent to help dig out the tunnel.
- Chelsea Erinne Evered as an unnamed pink and white diesel engine who gives Rusty a broom-plow in place of his cowcatcher and gives it back at the end of the film.
- Ray Porter as The Nightmare Train, a black experimental steam engine with power over nightmares
- Dominic Scott Kay as Richard, a boy who is brought to Dream Land when Rusty accidentally falls asleep on the job, ripping a hole in the dream-reality continuum. Little Engine volunteers to take him home, and they become close friends.
- Khamani Griffin as Marcus, Richard's best friend.
- Michael Rodrigo and Luke Williams as Scott and Stretch, a pair of bullies who antagonize Richard in the real world.
- Jamie Lee Curtis as Bev, a female clown toy who serves as the leader of the toys and Little Engine's engineer
- Charlie Schlatter as Major, a toy soldier who often finishes his sentences with "sir". He gives up his badge to help bandage a leak in Little Engine's water tank.
- Jodi Benson as Jillian, a ballerina doll who dances when she is happy
- Corbin Bleu as Lou, a toy giraffe who forms a duo with Bud

== Reception ==
Common Sense Media gave the film three stars stating that young train fans will enjoy the message-filled ride.

Jon Lyus from HeyUGuys called the film "a perfectly fine version of the story", but criticized its similarities to the BBC series Chuggington, which also features trains as characters.

== See also ==
- The Little Engine That Could – the book it was based on
- The Little Engine That Could (1991 film) – the film adaptation of said book
