= American Splendor (ship) =

Riverboat built for American Cruise Lines

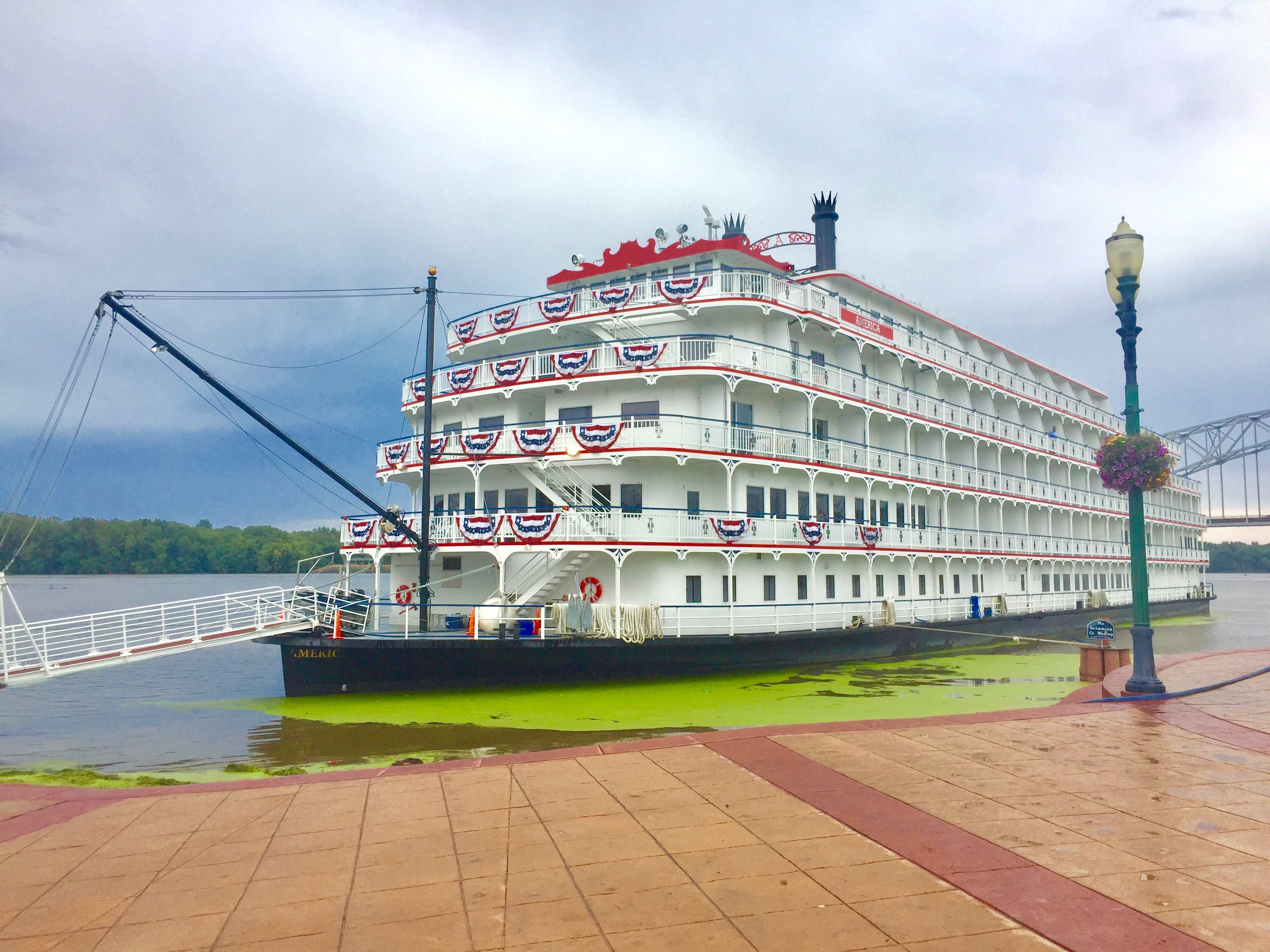
- The ship as America at the Port of Dubuque, 2016

History

United States
- Name: American Splendor
- Owner: American Cruise Lines
- Builder: Chesapeake Shipbuilding, Salisbury, Maryland
- Launched: August 7, 2015
- In service: May 7, 2016
- Home port: New Orleans, Louisiana
- Status: In service

General characteristics
- Type: Overnight riverboat

American Splendor, formerly America, is an overnight riverboat built by Chesapeake Shipbuilding in Salisbury, Maryland for American Cruise Lines (ACL) for overnight river cruising on the Mississippi, Ohio, Tennessee, and Cumberland rivers in the United States. American Splendor replaced the paddle wheeler American Pride on the Mississippi River in 2016 when that ship was repositioned to the Columbia River. According to American Cruise lines, American Splendor will have "features never seen before on a riverboat". American Splendor is slightly larger than previous ACL riverboats with a 185-passenger capacity. The ship's hull was launched on August 7, 2015, and moved to a basin where construction of the upper decks and outfitting will take place.
