= Spirit of Glacier Bay =

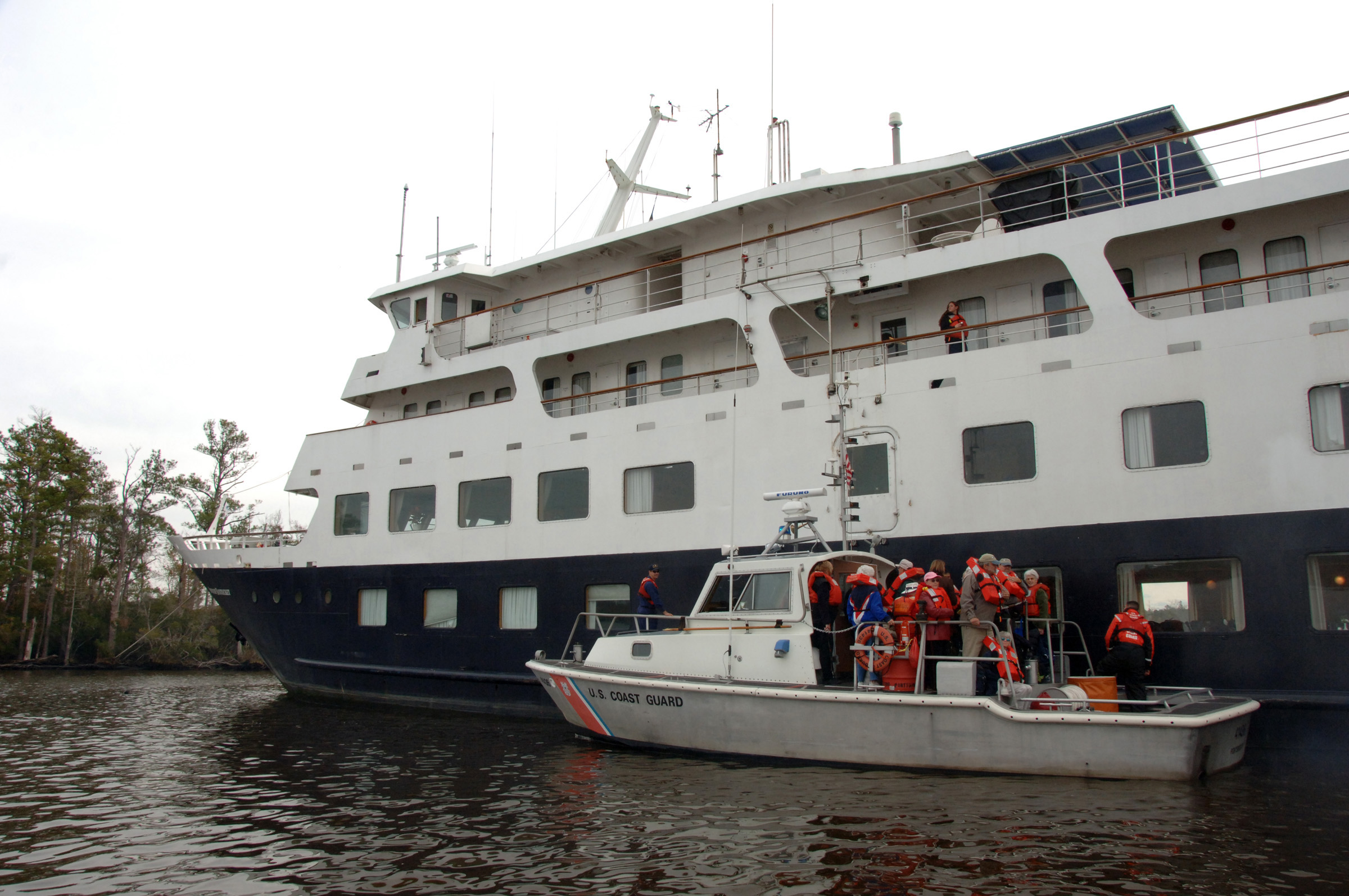
- US Coast Guard rescues passengers from the Spirit of Nantucket

History
- Name: Nantucket Clipper (1984–2006); Spirit of Nantucket (2006–2008); Spirit of Glacier Bay (2008–)
- Owner: Cruise West (2006–)
- Port of registry: 200*–2008: Wilmington, USA
- Builder: Jeffboat Corporation
- Launched: 1984
- Identification: Call sign: WDD4938; IMO number: 8883563; MMSI number: 367129000
- Status: Laid-Up

General characteristics
- Type: Cruise ship
- Tonnage: 1,471 GT
- Length: 52.578 m (172.50 ft)
- Beam: 11.28 m (37.0 ft)
- Capacity: 102 passengers
- Crew: 28

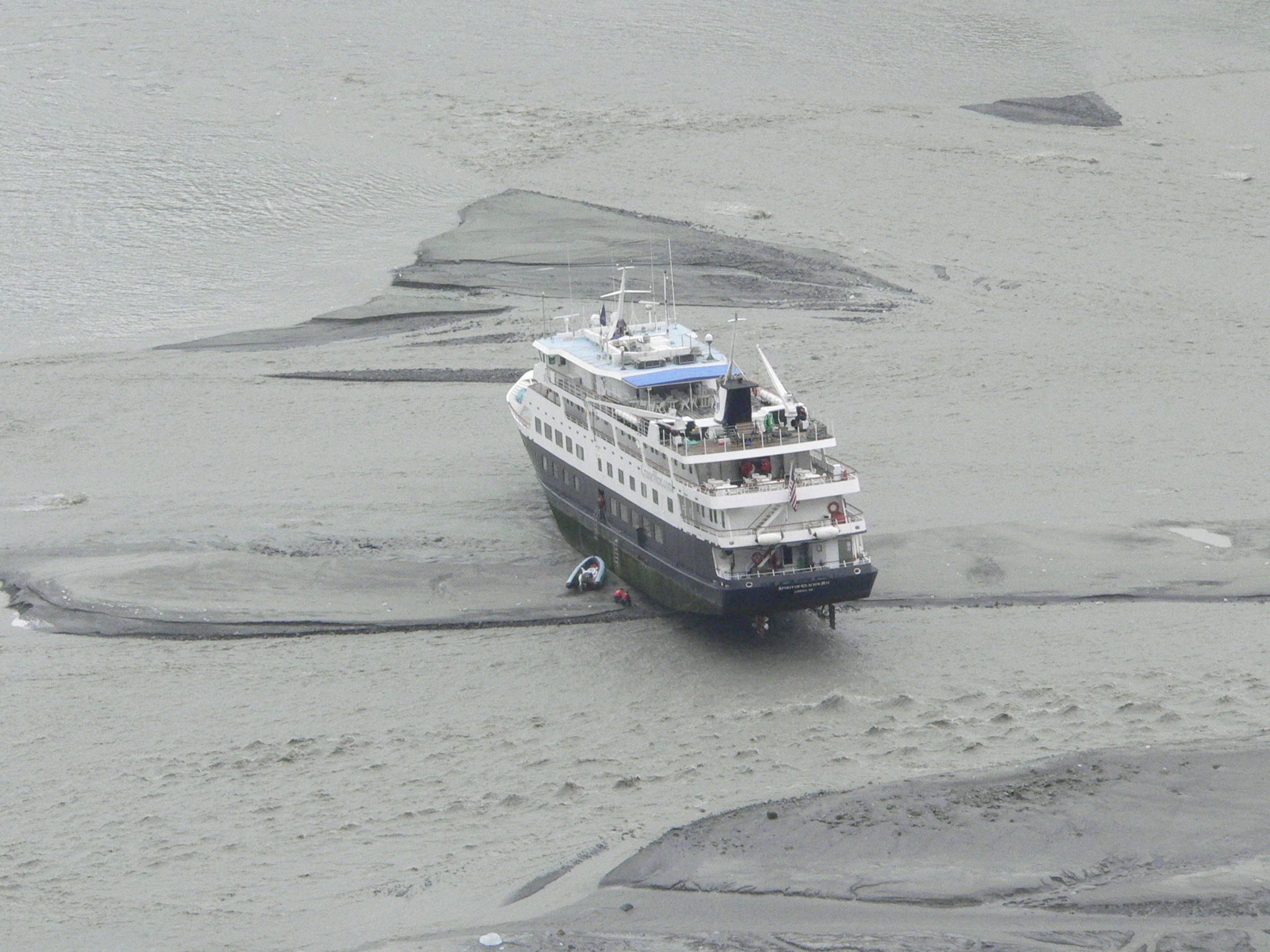
Spirit of Glacier Bay aground in Tarr Inlet, Alaska, July 2008

Spirit of Glacier Bay, formerly Spirit of Nantucket and Nantucket Clipper, and now called the Chichagof Dream is a small cruise ship that was owned and operated by Cruise West until 2010. She is 207 feet long, carries up to 102 passengers and approximately 28 crew. It was built in 1984 at Jeffersonville, Indiana for Clipper Cruise Lines by Jeffboat Corporation, and operated on the East Coast of North America, from the Caribbean Sea to the Canadian Maritimes and into the Great Lakes as far as Chicago. In 2006, Nantucket Clipper, along with fleet-mate Yorktown Clipper, was purchased by Seattle-based Cruise West. Nantucket Clipper was renamed Spirit of Nantucket at this time. In 2006 and 2007 she continued operating on her usual routes.

== Accidents ==
Spirit of Nantucket ran aground on 8 November 2007 while cruising the Intracoastal Waterway near Virginia Beach, Virginia. The vessel struck a submerged, uncharted object and the captain ordered for the ship to be driven into the shallows to avoid settling on the bottom in deeper water. Sixty-six people were on the ship at the time; there were no reported injuries related to the incident. Coast Guard officials said the cruise ship's captain acted properly by running the ship aground to prevent it from sinking in deeper water. At least one survivor said she never felt in danger.

Cruise West repositioned Spirit of Nantucket to their Pacific operations in early 2008. The vessel was renamed Spirit of Glacier Bay (2), reviving the name once held by the first overnight vessel in the fleet. On 7 July 2008, Spirit of Glacier Bay (2) ran aground again, this time in her namesake park at the head of Tarr Inlet.58°59′16″N 136°56′46″W No casualties or injuries were reported and passengers were given options to be re-accommodated on other Cruise West cruises, receive sizable refunds of their cruise fare, and/or given gift certificates towards a future cruise.

After her grounding, Spirit of Glacier Bay went back to Seattle, where she laid up at Jacobsens Terminal in the Ballard neighborhood. She was used from 2008 to 2010 as floating accommodation, training, meeting, and storage space for Cruise West.

In 2010 Cruise West announced plans to rename the vessel either Spirit of America or Spirit of Adventure, give her the extensive shipyard work necessary to make her structurally sound and operational again, and to run the vessel on a series of itineraries in eastern North America similar to her original routes, including the Mississippi, the New England coast, and the Great Lakes / St. Lawrence River. Cruise West ceased operations on 18 September 2010, before beginning the work necessary to return the vessel to service.

In 2015, the vessel was purchased by Alaska Dream Cruises. After extensive modification, she was placed back into service in Southeast Alaska as the Chichagof Dream.

== See also ==
- List of cruise ships
