= UnCruise Adventures =

American cruise operator

- Formerly: American Safari Cruises
- Type: Wholly owned Subsidiary
- Industry: Hospitality, Travel & Tourism
- Founded: 1996 in Everett, Washington, United States
- Headquarters: Fishermen's Terminal, Seattle, Washington
- Area served: Central America, Pacific Ocean, United States
- Key people: Dan Blanchard, CEO; Tim Jacox, President & COO; Eric Gier, CFO
- Products: Cruises, river cruises
- Parent: InnerSea Discoveries Alaska Inc.
- Website: www.uncruise.com

UnCruise Adventures (formerly American Safari Cruises) is an American-owned small ship adventure cruise line founded in Everett, Washington. In 2008, the then American Safari Cruises was purchased by the parent company InnerSea Discoveries Alaska Inc. In early 2013 after a fleet expansion, the American Safari Cruises was renamed as Un-Cruise Adventures. In 2016, the company rebranded itself UnCruise Adventures, while also unveiling a new logo. Currently the cruise line operates 9 ships, 8 of which are fully owned, Most of the fleet sails under the U.S. flag. The cruise line operates two offices, the main headquarters is located in Seattle, Washington and the second is located in Juneau, Alaska. It offers small group tours and expedition voyages in destinations ranging from Alaska to the Galápagos Islands.

== History ==
UnCruise Adventures was founded as the American Safari Cruises in 1996 in order to provide small yacht cruises in Alaska. Following in 1997, the American Safari Cruise commenced operations with a charted yacht.

The company focuses on small vessels, with capacities ranging from 22 to 88. Their tours take guests on seven to twenty-one night trips to destinations such as Alaska, British Columbia, coastal Washington, Columbia and Snake Rivers, Mexico, Hawaii, Costa Rica and Panama. The focus is on nature.

UnCruise Adventures was listed on Conde Nast's "Best Cruise Ships in the World" 2021 list, and number 8 on USA Today's 2021 "Best Adventure Cruise Line" list.

== Fleet ==
=== Current fleet ===
==== Wilderness fleet ====
- Wilderness Adventurer
- Wilderness Discoverer
- Wilderness Explorer

==== Safari fleet ====
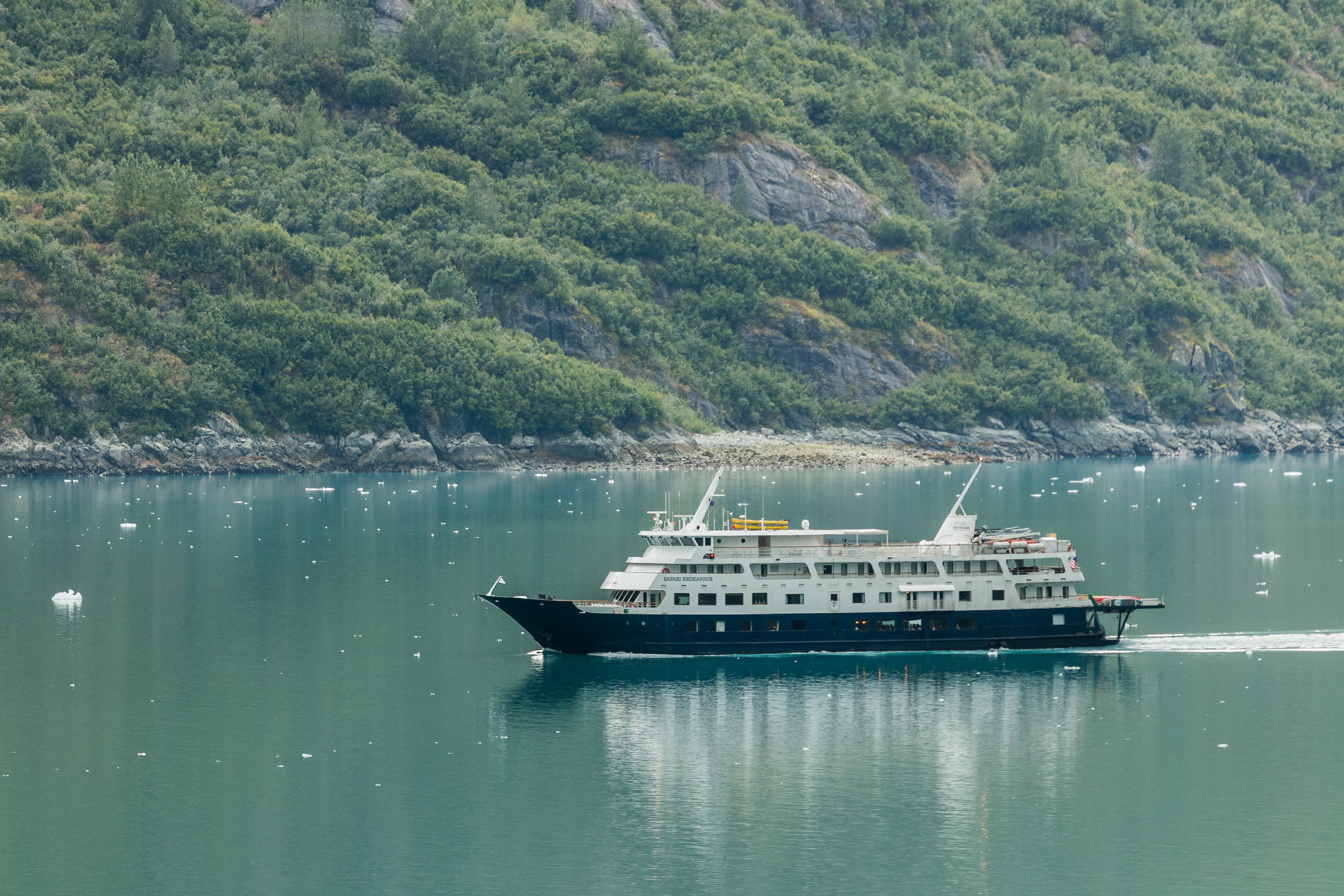
Safari Endeavour in the Glacier Bay National Park, Alaska.

- Safari Endeavour
- Safari Voyager
- Safari Explorer
- Safari Quest
- La Pinta

==== River Cruise fleet ====
- S.S. Legacy

== See also ==
- List of cruise lines
