= Chesapeake Shipbuilding =

Shipbuilding company in Maryland, United States

Chesapeake Shipbuilding is a shipbuilding company, based in Salisbury, Maryland, United States, since 1980, on the site of the former Roberts Shipyard. They are capable of constructing vessels up to 450 feet in length on the 13 acre yard. The yard includes 2,000 feet (670 yd) of deepwater bulkhead along the Wicomico River. The company was contracted in 2022 to build 12 new hybrid catamaran cruise ships for United States waters. In addition to cruise ships, the company also builds tug boats.

== Vessels ==
Notable vessels constructed include:

- American Splendor
- Independence
- Queen of the Mississippi (2015)
- Queen of the Mississippi (2017)
- Woodland Ferry
