= American Cruise Lines =

American river and small-ship cruise line

- Type: Private
- Industry: Travel and Hospitality
- Founded: 1973; 53 years ago
- Headquarters: Guilford, Connecticut, U.S.
- Area served: United States
- Key people: Charles B. Robertson, President & CEO (2019-Present); Charles A. Robertson, Founder, Chairman & CEO (1973-2019)
- Products: Cruises
- Website: www.americancruiselines.com

American Cruise Lines is the largest river and small-ship cruise line in the United States with its headquarters in Guilford, Connecticut. The line has 30 small U.S.-flagged cruise ships that cruise along the Eastern Seaboard (Maine to Florida), the Hudson River, the Chesapeake Bay, the Great Lakes, and the Western Seaboard (including Alaska and Puget Sound) as well as the Mississippi, Ohio, Cumberland, Arkansas, and Tennessee rivers and the Columbia-Snake river system in the United States.

== History ==
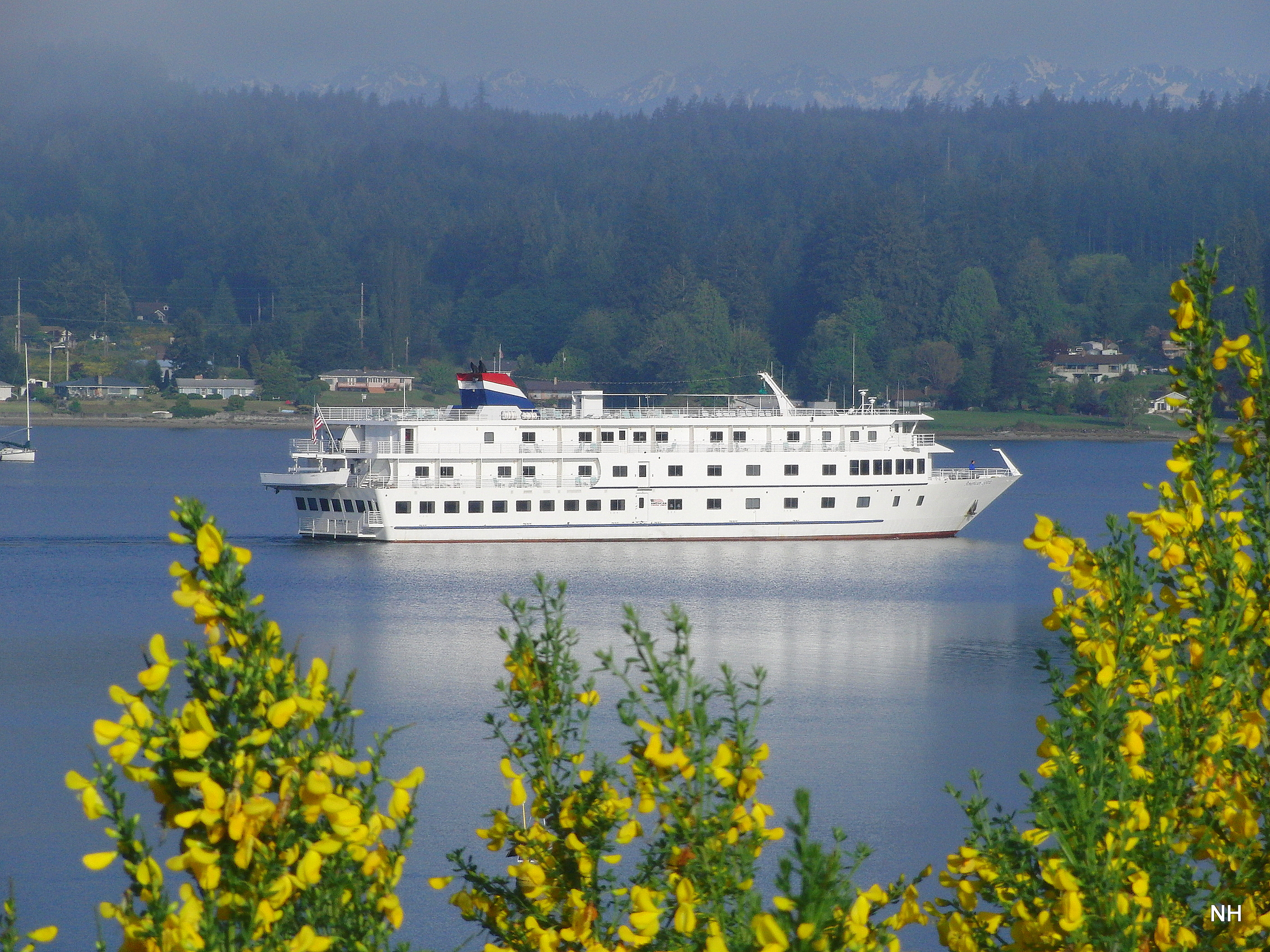
American Spirit visiting Liberty Bay in Western Washington, USA

American Cruise Lines was founded in the early 70s. The company operates the largest and only 100% U.S.-flagged fleet of riverboats and small cruise ships in the world, with 30 new riverboats and small cruise ships exploring around the United States, including seven riverboats on the Mississippi River and ten on the Columbia and Snake rivers.

All American Cruise Lines' riverboats and small ships cruise only in the United States following 100% U.S. itineraries along U.S. rivers, lakes, bays, and protected coastal waterways along the East and West coasts. The company has over 50 domestic itineraries and all cruises visit only U.S. ports of call.

In May 2026, American Cruise Lines launched the newest riverboat in the country, American Encore, on the Columbia and Snake Rivers. The 180-passenger riverboat was christened in Lewiston, Idaho on May 12th, and was the first riverboat ever christened in the state. In June 2026, American Cruise Lines also launched the newest small cruise ship in the U.S.A., American Maverick. The 130-passenger small ship was christened in Newport, Rhode Island on June 16th. The company announced another new small ship, American Ranger, will launch in September 2026, and has recently announced 9 other new ships launching in 2027, 2028 and 2029. These 9 new ships will include both new riverboats and small ships.

In 2018, the company introduced modern American Riverboat, American Song, on the Mississippi River. American Song was the first contemporary style riverboat in the U.S.A. Accommodating 180-passengers in all-balcony staterooms, American Song's innovative design and amenities are a complete departure from the more traditional paddle-wheel riverboats more commonly seen cruising the Mississippi River in previous decades. Time magazine named American Song one of the World's Greatest Places in 2019.

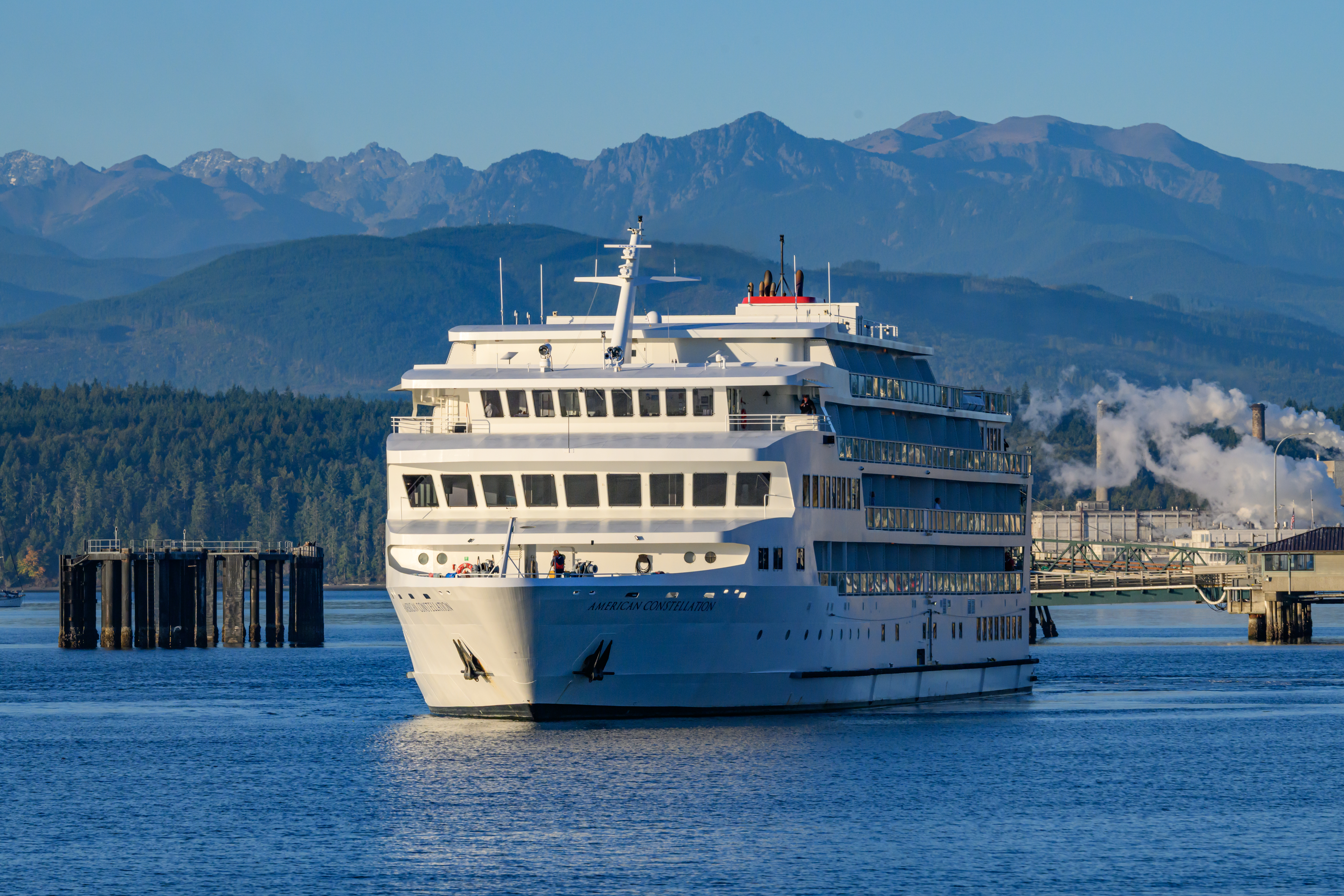
American Constellation leaving Port Townsend, Washington, USA

Since the introduction of the series flagship, American Song, American Cruise Lines has launched six more modern American Riverboats: American Harmony in 2019; American Jazz in 2020; American Melody in 2021; American Symphony in 2022; American Serenade in 2023 (named Cruise Critic's Best New River Cruise Ship of 2023); and American Encore in 2026. The company has recenly announced more new modern riverboats, American Anthem, American Grace, American Beauty, and American Rhapsody, joining the fleet in 2027, 2028, and 2029. All the company's new riverboats feature world-class amenities including 100% private balcony accommodations, and the largest-in-class cabins (singles, doubles & suites) with en-suite bathrooms. The company's newest riverboat, American Encore launched in May 2026, features one of the largest riverboat suites in the world, the Signature Suite, at 1,500 square-feet.

In 2022, American Cruise Lines announced Project Blue, a new series of twelve small U.S. built ships for domestic cruises exploring coastally around the United States. The company's Project Blue ships are designed to cruise rivers, bays, lakes and U.S. protected coastal waterways in the same manner as the company's riverboats, sailing close to home and visiting only U.S. ports of call. All the company's new small ships and riverboats are built by Chesapeake Shipbuilding, in Salisbury Maryland.

In 2023 and 2024, the first four ships in the Project Blue series were introduced. These included four new 100-passenger Coastal Cats, American Eagle, American Glory, American Liberty, and American Legend (American Eagle, and American Glory, are namesakes of original company vessels that have since been retired).

In 2025 and 2026, American Cruise Lines continued the series, introducing four 130-passenger Patriot Class ships, American Patriot, American Pioneer, American Maverick and American Ranger. These four new small cruise ships, along with the four Coastal Cats, sail a variety of U.S. itineraries along the East Coast from Maine to Florida. The company has announced that two more 130-passenger Patriot Class sister ships, American Mariner and American Navigator will launch in 2027.

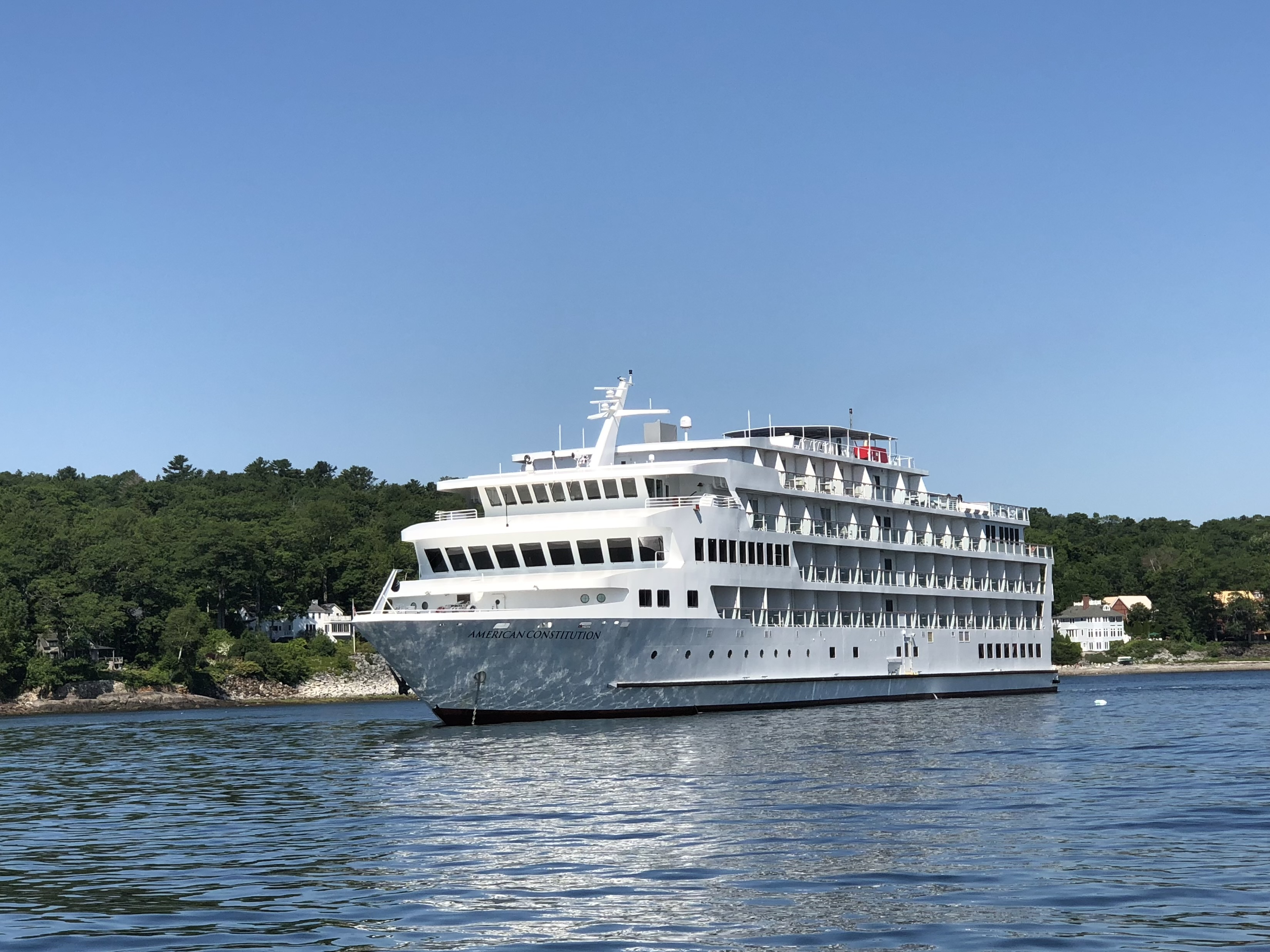
American Constitution in Camden, Maine, USA

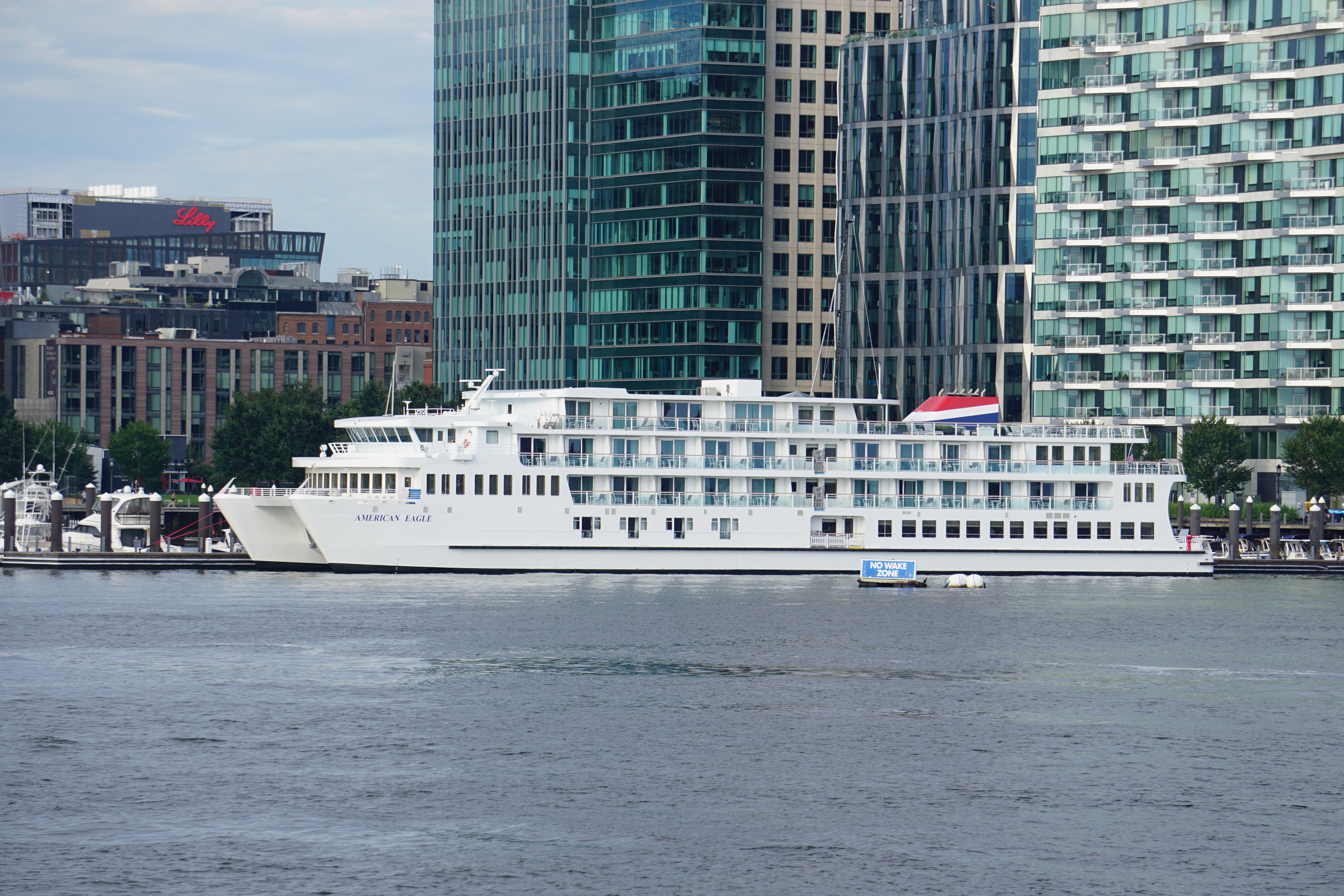
Coastal Cat ship American Eagle at Boston

American Cruise Lines fleet includes other small ships like 170-passenger sister ships, American Constellation and American Constitution, which cruise in Alaska and Puget Sound.

The company also operates the only four remaining paddle-wheel riverboats (available for overnight river cruises in the United States). These classically-styled riverboats with their iconic red paddle-wheels were redecorated and renamed in 2022, while still retaining their nostalgic and historic aesthetic. Queen of the Mississippi, Queen of the West, and America became American Heritage, American West, and American Splendor; and American Pride retained its original name. They operate on the Mississippi River and tributaries, and on the Columbia and Snake Rivers.

On November 13, 2026, American Heritage was struck by tanker Atlantic Asphalt while it was docked in New Orleans, and subsequently capsized, injuring 39 passengers.

== Fleet ==
=== Current fleet ===
==== Small Ships U.S. East & West Coasts ====
Independence Class Coastal Ship
Name	Built	Shipyard	Passenger Capacity
American Spirit	2005	Chesapeake Shipbuilding, Salisbury, Maryland	90
American Star	2007	Chesapeake Shipbuilding, Salisbury, Maryland	90
American Independence	2010	Chesapeake Shipbuilding, Salisbury, Maryland	90

Constellation Class Coastal Ship
Name	Built	Shipyard	Passenger Capacity
American Constellation	2017	Chesapeake Shipbuilding, Salisbury, Maryland	170
American Constitution	2018	Chesapeake Shipbuilding, Salisbury, Maryland	170

Coastal Cat Class Ship
Name	Built	Shipyard	Passenger Capacity
American Eagle	2023	Chesapeake Shipbuilding, Salisbury, Maryland	100
American Glory	2023	Chesapeake Shipbuilding, Salisbury, Maryland	100
American Liberty	2024	Chesapeake Shipbuilding, Salisbury, Maryland	100
American Legend	2024	Chesapeake Shipbuilding, Salisbury, Maryland	100

Patriot Class Coastal Ship
Name	Built	Shipyard	Passenger Capacity
American Patriot	2025	Chesapeake Shipbuilding, Salisbury, Maryland	130
American Pioneer	2025	Chesapeake Shipbuilding, Salisbury, Maryland	130
Future Ships
American Maverick	June 2026	Chesapeake Shipbuilding, Salisbury, Maryland	130
American Ranger	September 2026	Chesapeake Shipbuilding, Salisbury, Maryland	130
American Mariner	2027	Chesapeake Shipbuilding, Salisbury, Maryland	130
American Navigator	2027	Chesapeake Shipbuilding, Salisbury, Maryland	130

Paddlewheel Riverboat
Name	Built	Shipyard	Passenger Capacity
American West	1995	Nichols Bros. Boat Builders, Freeland, Washington	110
American Pride	2012	Chesapeake Shipbuilding, Salisbury, Maryland	130
American Heritage	2015	Chesapeake Shipbuilding, Salisbury, Maryland	150
American Splendor	2016	Chesapeake Shipbuilding, Salisbury, Maryland	180

American Riverboat
Name	Built	Shipyard	Passenger Capacity	Notes
American Song	2018	Chesapeake Shipbuilding, Salisbury, Maryland	180	First ship in new modern American Riverboat series
American Harmony	2019	Chesapeake Shipbuilding, Salisbury, Maryland	180	Additional deck of staterooms on Deck 5
American Jazz	2020	Chesapeake Shipbuilding, Salisbury, Maryland	180	Additional deck of staterooms on Deck 5
American Melody	2021	Chesapeake Shipbuilding, Salisbury, Maryland	180	New top deck 5 design with added Skywalk
American Symphony	2022	Chesapeake Shipbuilding, Salisbury, Maryland	180	New top deck 5 design with added Skywalk
American Serenade	2023	Chesapeake Shipbuilding, Salisbury, Maryland	180	New top deck 5 design with added Skywalk
Future Ships
American Encore	May 2026	Chesapeake Shipbuilding, Salisbury, Maryland	180	Reconfigured Layout, including River Lounge moved down to lowest deck, added signature suite
American Anthem	2027	Chesapeake Shipbuilding, Salisbury, Maryland	180	Reconfigured Layout, including River Lounge moved down to lowest deck, added signature suite
American Grace	2028	Chesapeake Shipbuilding, Salisbury, Maryland	180	Reconfigured Layout, including River Lounge moved down to lowest deck, added signature suite

=== Former fleet ===
Former Ships
Name	Built	Shipyard	Passenger Capacity	Status
American Eagle	1975	Harvey F. Gamage Shipyard, South Bristol, Maine	60	Sold in 1984, renamed Island Clipper. Now sailing in Fantasía del Mar in Panama.
Independence	1976	Chesapeake Shipbuilding, Salisbury, Maryland	87	Sold 1985 to Great Pacific Cruise Lines and renamed Columbia. Now sailing as now sailing as Wilderness Explorer.
America	1982	Chesapeake Shipbuilding, Salisbury, Maryland	87	Now sailing as Safari Voyager with UnCruise.
Savannah	1984	Chesapeake Shipbuilding, Salisbury, Maryland	140	Renamed Terra Australia, sank 2002.
New Orleans	1985	Chesapeake Shipbuilding, Salisbury, Maryland	140	Unknown
Charleston	1987	Chesapeake Shipbuilding, Salisbury, Maryland	125	
American Eagle	2000	Chesapeake Shipbuilding, Salisbury, Maryland		Moored at Chesapeake Shipbuilding as housing for contractors. Sold for scrap in Baltimore, Maryland.
American Glory	2002	Chesapeake Shipbuilding, Salisbury, Maryland		Scuttled off coast of Delaware on November 4, 2019, for artificial reef.
