= American Heritage (ship) =

2015-built US riverboat

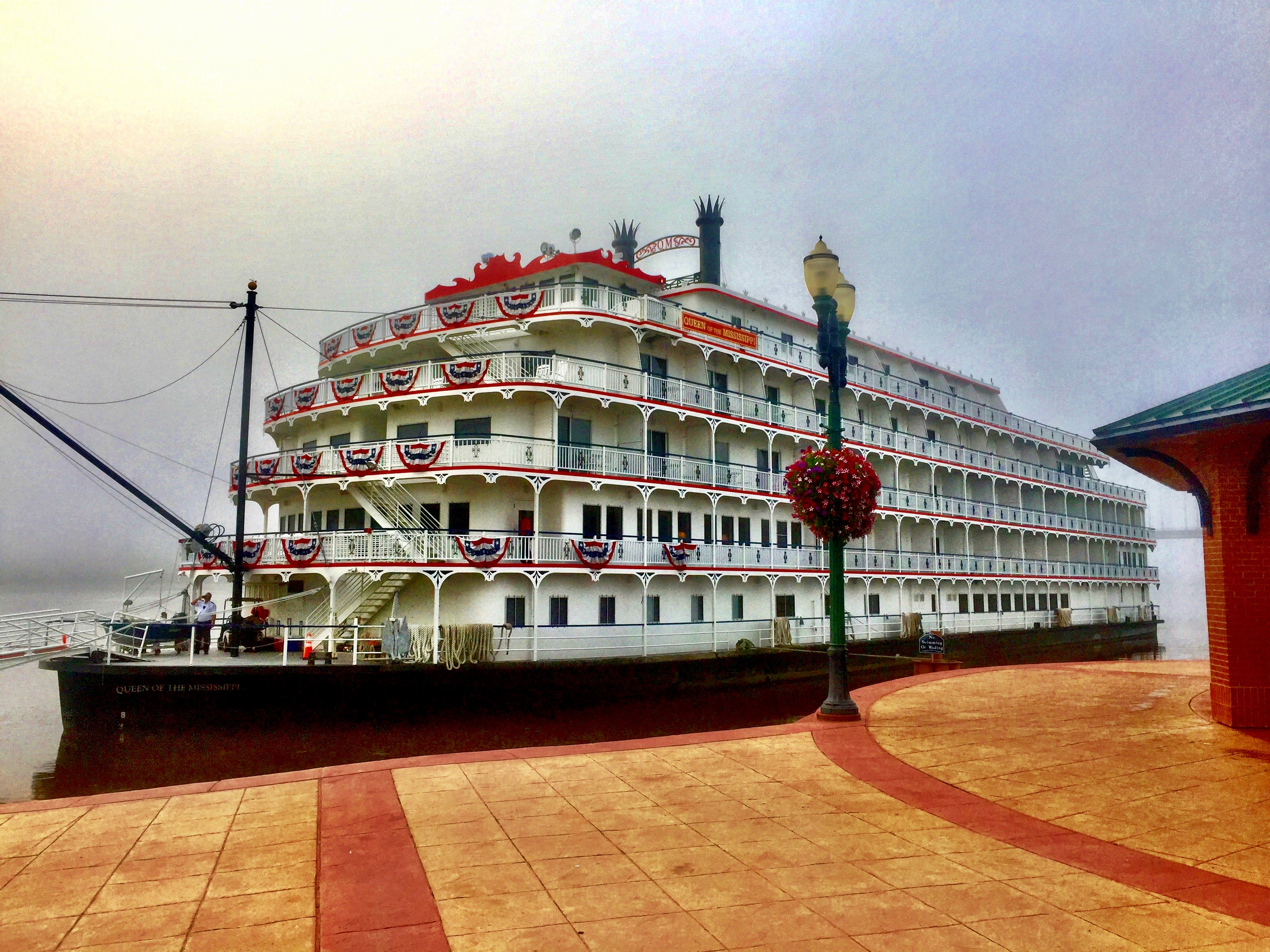
- Queen of the Mississippi at the Port of Dubuque, 2016

History

United States
- Name: American Eagle (2015–2016); Queen of the Mississippi (2016–2021); American Heritage (2022–2026)
- Owner: American Cruise Lines
- Builder: Chesapeake Shipbuilding, Salisbury, Maryland
- Yard number: 104
- In service: April 2015
- Out of service: November 2026
- Home port: New Orleans, Louisiana
- Identification: Call sign: WDH7491; MMSI Doc. No.: 367648680
- Fate: Capsized and partially sunk after collision on November 13, 2026

General characteristics
- Type: Overnight riverboat
- Tonnage: 2,700 GT
- Length: 90 m (300 ft)
- Beam: 16 m (52 ft)
- Draft: 2.3 m (7.5 ft)
- Propulsion: 2 × Caterpillar; ACERT Diesel; 3 × Caterpillar; C-18 Diesel (Aux)
- Speed: 12 knots (22 km/h; 14 mph)
- Capacity: 150 passengers

American Heritage was a sternwheel riverboat, owned and operated by American Cruise Lines, initially as American Eagle, and then Queen of the Mississippi. She was built by Chesapeake Shipbuilding in Salisbury, Maryland, with capacity for 150 passengers on overnight river cruises within the United States, and entered service in April 2015.

On November 13, 2026, American Heritage was berthed in the New Orleans Cruise Port while operating on the Mississippi when she was struck by the asphalt and bitumen tanker Atlantic Asphalt; she capsized but with no loss of life.

== Design and construction ==
American Heritage was designed to cruise on major rivers in the U.S., particularly the Mississippi, Columbia and Snake rivers. She is 90 m (300 ft) long, 16 m (52 ft) wide and 3.6 m (12 ft) depth of hull; the draft is 2.3 m (7.5 ft) and she measures 2,700 GT. Her stern-mounted paddle wheel is driven by a hydraulic motor, powered by diesel engines. This is augmented by two Z-drive units to provide a higher cruising speed and better maneuverability.

The vessel accommodates 150 passengers in 84 staterooms spread over five decks, all outward-facing, with private baths, and all but six also have private furnished balconies. The ship deck plans:

- 1st Deck - double- and single-occupancy staterooms; dining room
- 2nd Deck - double- and single-occupancy staterooms, all with private balconies; three lounges
- 3rd Deck - owners suites, double- and single-occupancy staterooms, all with sliding doors to private balconies; library
- 4th Deck - owners suites, double- and single-occupancy staterooms, all with sliding doors to private balconies; two lounges
- 5th Deck - Pilot house, double- and single-occupancy staterooms, promenade, shaded public area, sundeck, putting green

American Heritage is the second of two sister ships built for American Cruise Lines by Chesapeake Shipbuilding in Salisbury, Maryland in 2012 and 2015. The first was Queen of the Mississippi (yard no.100), which was transferred to the Pacific North West in 2015 and renamed American Pride; the second was completed in March 2015 as American Eagle (yard no.104), with some internal differences like internal arrangement and cabins on the 5th deck. Both paddle wheels were completely renovated in 2022.

== Collision ==
On November 13, 2026, the tanker Atlantic Asphalt allided with the American Heritage, which capsized on its side. All 197 people on board survived.
