= SS Tuscania =

Several ships have borne the name SS Tuscania, all in the Cunard-subsidiary Anchor Line. These include:

- SS Tuscania (1914), a 14,348-ton liner torpedoed in 1918 while transporting US soldiers to Europe.
- SS Tuscania (1922), a 16,991-ton liner sold to the Greek Line in 1939 and renamed the Nea Hellas.
