= SS Northern Star =

SS Northern Star may refer to:

- SS Empire Caribou, launched in 1919 and renamed Northern Star when sold to the American Star Line in 1920
- SS Northern Star (1961), an Ocean Liner of the Shaw-Savill line

== See also ==
- MS Northern Star, a ferry in service with P&O Irish Sea and Dart Line, 2002–2004
