= Imperial Majesty Cruise Line =

- Company type: Cruise line
- Industry: Transportation
- Founded: 1999
- Defunct: 2009
- Fate: Replaced by Celebration Cruise Line
- Headquarters: Plantation, Florida
- Products: Cruises
- Website: https://www.imperialmajesty.com (defunct)

Imperial Majesty Cruise Line was a budget cruise line that had operated 2 and 3 day voyages out of Port Everglades, Florida to Nassau, Bahamas. The company was founded in 1999. The cruise line attracted both vacationers and vintage ship fans from around the world. The cruise line's current operations ended on March 9, 2009, when the Regal Empress was retired. In that same week, its operations were replaced by Celebration Cruise Line, operating for the same company that Imperial Majesty was part of.

== History ==
Imperial Majesty Cruise Line begun operations in 1999 by chartering the 1955-built SS OceanBreeze from Premier Cruise Line and operating two-day cruises out of Port Everglades to Nassau, Bahamas. Imperial Majesty later purchased the ship and gave it a multi-million dollar refurbishment. The ship was kept in good condition throughout Imperial Majesty's ownership. In 2003, due to high costs, Imperial Majesty sold the OceanBreeze for scrap and replaced it with another vintage ship, the 1953-built MS Regal Empress, after its previous owner folded. In the fall of 2008, several sources reported that the Regal Empress was due to be replaced by the 1981-built cruiseferry MS Bahamas Celebration in 2009, but this information proved to be false. Instead, the Bahamas Celebration was operated by Celebration Cruise Line, a new cruise line operating under the same company Imperial Majesty cruise lines operated under. On March 9, 2009, the MS Bahamas Celebration took over Regal Empress cruise schedule. All crew and food stores were transferred to Bahamas Celebration prior to the ships departure. The Regal Empress was laid up in Freeport, Bahamas from March 16 until March 27. It was reported by Maritime Matters on March 26 that the Regal Empress was sold for scrap.

== Former Fleet ==
Ship	Built	Entered Service for Imperial Majesty Cruise Line	Tonnage	Flag	Notes	Image
OceanBreeze	1955	1999–2003	20,204 GRT	Bahamas	Previously sailed for Premier Cruise Line, sold for scrap in 2003.	
Regal Empress	1953	2003–2009	21,909 GRT	Bahamas	Built for Greek Line as the SS Olympia, sold for scrap in 2009.	
