= SS Southern Cross (1954) =

Scrapped passenger ship

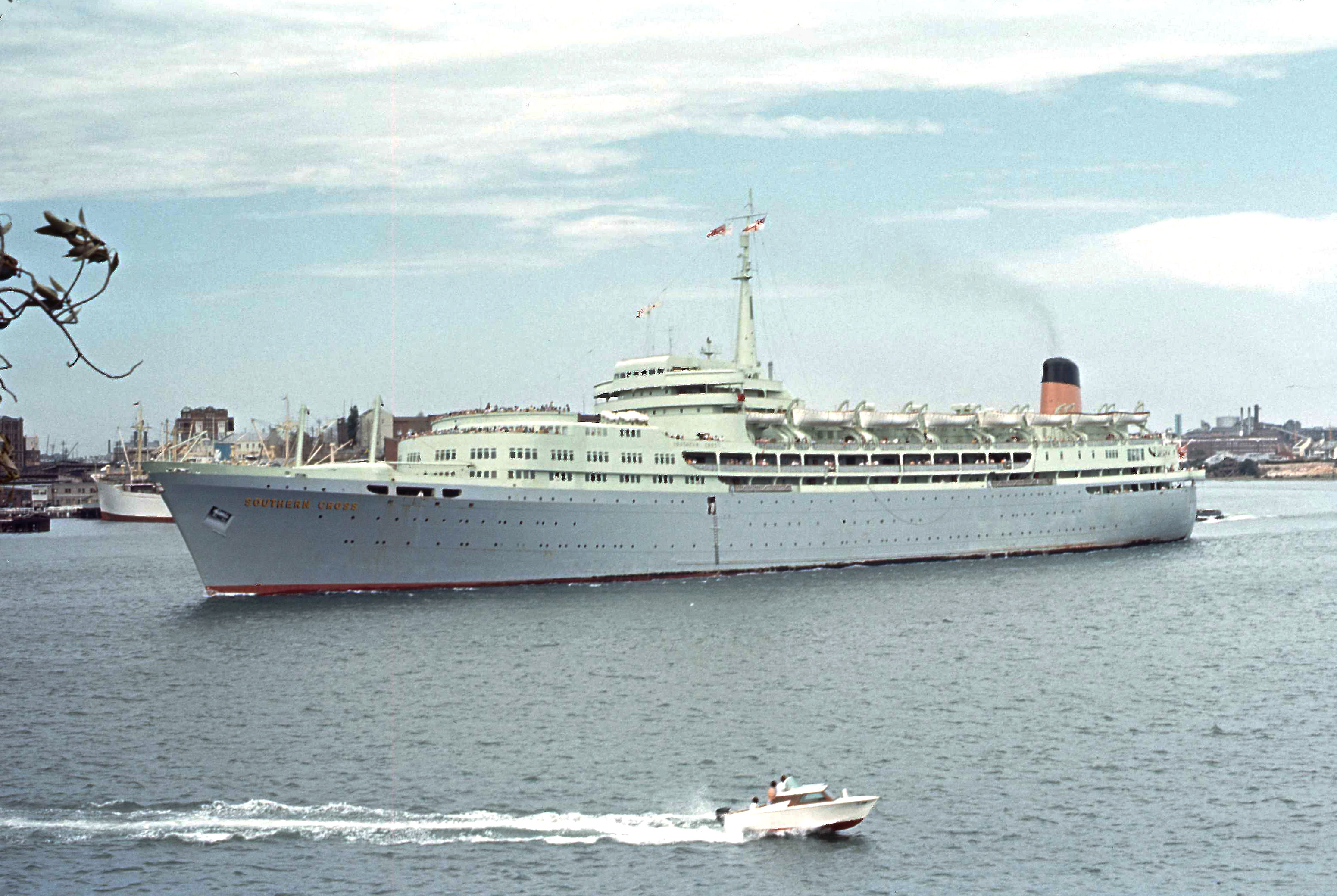
- Southern Cross in Sydney

History
- Name: 1955–1972: Southern Cross; 1973–1980: Calypso; 1980–1981: Calypso I; 1981–1992: Azure Seas; 1992–2003: OceanBreeze
- Owner: 1955–1973: Shaw, Savill & Albion Line; 1973–1980: Ulysses Line; 1981–1986: Western Cruise Line; 1986–1991: Admiral Cruises; 1991–1997: Dolphin Cruise Lines; 1997–1999: Premier Cruise Line; 1999–2003: Imperial Majesty Cruises
- Builder: Harland & Wolff, Belfast
- Yard number: 1498
- Launched: 17 August 1954
- Sponsored by: Queen Elizabeth II
- Completed: February 1955
- Maiden voyage: 29 March 1955
- Out of service: 27 June 2003
- Identification: IMO number: 5335319
- Fate: Scrapped at Chittagong, Bangladesh, in 2003

General characteristics
- Tonnage: 20,204 GRT (as built)
- Length: 184,50 meters / 604 feet
- Beam: 24 meters / 78.4 feet
- Draught: 25ft 10in
- Installed power: 20,000shp
- Propulsion: Geared turbines, twin screw
- Speed: 20 knots (37 km/h; 23 mph)
- Capacity: As built 1,160 tourist class

SS Southern Cross was an ocean liner built in 1955 by Harland & Wolff, Belfast, Northern Ireland for the Shaw, Savill & Albion Line for Europe to Australia services. In 1975 she was rebuilt as a cruise ship and subsequently sailed under the names Calypso, Azure Seas and OceanBreeze until 2003 when she was sold for scrap to Ahmed Muztaba Steel Industries, Chittagong, Bangladesh.

The Southern Cross was the first passenger ship of over 20,000 gross register tons to be built that had the engine room (and as a result of that, the funnel) located near the stern, rather than amidships. She started a trend of aft-engined ships, and today most passenger ships are built this way. Southern Cross was also the first major liner to have no cargo space, other than for ship's stores and passenger luggage.

== Design and construction ==
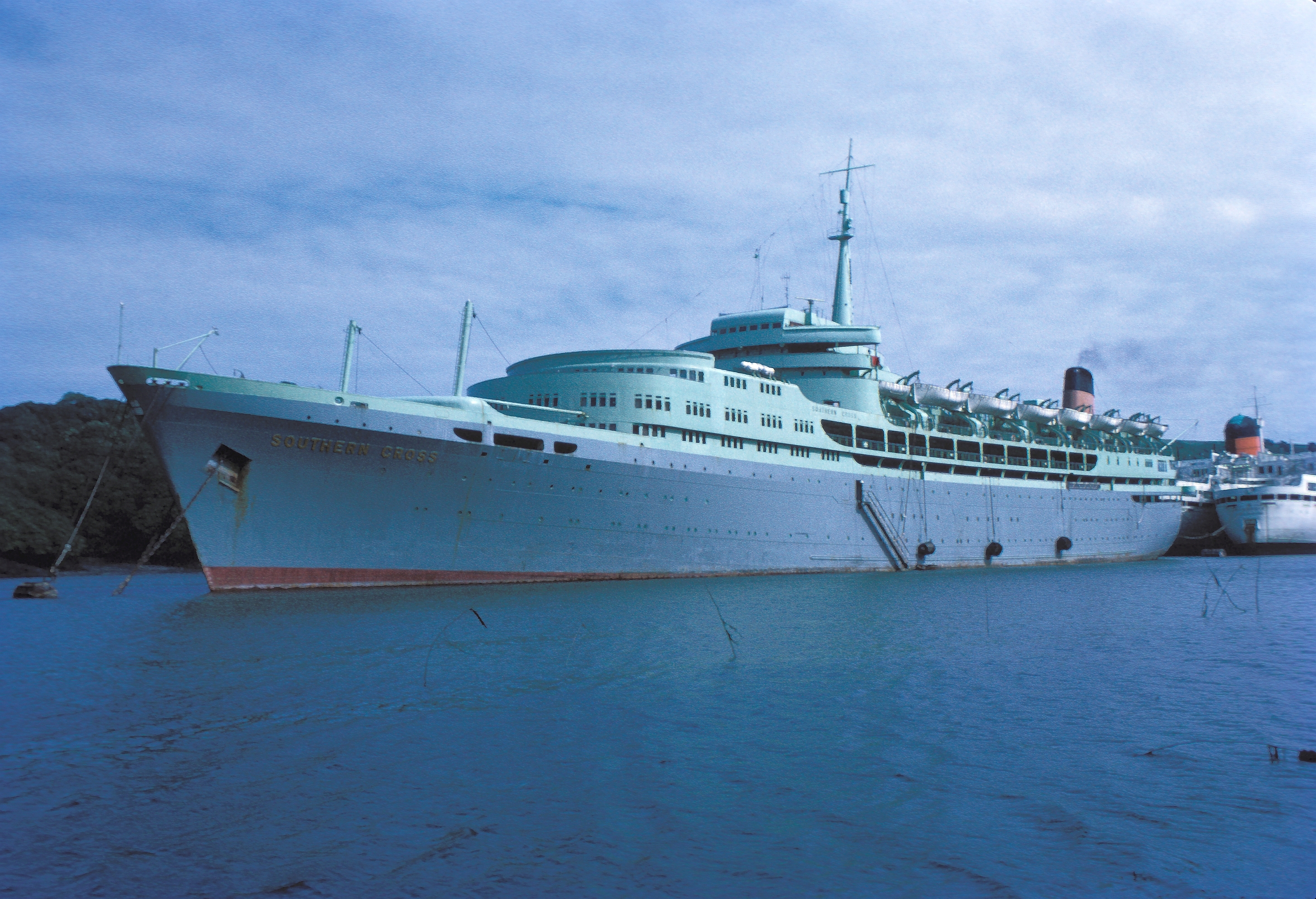
Southern Cross

The Southern Cross was planned in the early 1950s as the new flagship of the Shaw, Savill & Albion Line to be used on the Europe to Australia immigrant run. However, the ship was by no means a basic migrant ship. When the ship was under planning, Shaw Savill chairman Basil Sanderson came up with the revolutionary idea of placing the ship's engines and funnel aft, freeing the areas amidships (which is generally considered the most comfortable area for passengers) for cabins and public rooms. Sanderson eventually managed to persuade the board of the viability of his idea, and on 16 July 1952 an order for the new all-passenger liner was placed at the Harland & Wolff shipyard.

Although the new ship was designed as an all-tourist class vessel for an immigrant route, she was designed with fairly luxurious facilities for her time. All passenger cabins were air conditioned, fitted with hot and cold running water, and inside cabins had circular lights that were switched on gradually in the morning, mimicking the rising of the sun. However, only the most expensive cabins had private bathroom facilities. The aft-funnel arrangement made it possible to build a large open lido deck midship, including a 5,000 square feet (460 m^{2}) sports deck area. In addition to the two outdoor pools there was one indoor pool. All inside public spaces were air conditioned, and included a two-deck high cinema (also used as a dancing venue), two large public lounges, two restaurants, a writing room/library and a smoking room. Wood panelling was widely used in the interior decorations, that were made to be light, airy, and modern to be comfortable in oppressive tropical climates.

Externally the ship was of a completely new design. In addition to the funnel being placed quite far aft, the bridge was placed nearer amidships, rather than the usual forward position. This meant the superstructure extended considerably further forward than the bridge. These features didn't win high accolades at the time, a contemporary review describing her as being "not very beautiful, but very efficient", but P&O's Canberra of 1961, ordered one year after Southern Cross entered service, was built to an almost identical design though on a larger scale.

In 1953 Basil Sanderson approached Buckingham Palace, asking if Queen Elizabeth II would be willing to launch the new ship and choose a name from a list of suggestions. The Queen agreed, and chose the name Southern Cross. When launched on 17 August 1954, Southern Cross became the first passenger liner to be launched by a reigning British monarch.

Southern Cross emerged in the new Shaw Savill liner livery of a pale-grey-painted hull and familiar dark-buff funnel with a black top. This was complemented by the innovative use of pale-green eau de nil paintwork for the superstructure.

== Service history ==
=== 1955-1971 ===
On 23 February 1955, Southern Cross was delivered to her owners. After her trials late January 1955, she departed 29 March on her maiden voyage for Australia and New Zealand. Her westerly directioned 76-day voyage out of Southampton included ports Trinidad, Curaçao, the Panama Canal, Tahiti, Fiji, Wellington (2 May), Auckland, Sydney (9 May), Melbourne (11 May), Fremantle (16 May), Durban, Cape Town, Las Palmas and back to Southampton. Normally she might make four such circumnavigations every year.

The Southern Cross enjoyed great success during the early years of her Shaw Savill service, so in the late 1950s a second ship of similar design but larger dimensions was ordered, entering service in 1962 as the Northern Star. When she entered service, Northern Star replaced Southern Cross on the eastwards Australian run, and Southern Cross took over the westwards itinerary, visiting the same ports as before but in reverse order.

During the 1960s competition from other passenger liners - and from the jet aeroplane - increased on the Australian run, putting financial pressure on Shaw Savill's around the year service to Australia and New Zealand. In a surprising move, parent company Furness Withy transferred three 20,300 GRT former Royal Mail Lines cargo/passenger ships to Shaw Savill in 1968/69, each with capacity for 464 passengers. In early 1970, Shaw Savill also acquired the Canadian Pacific Steamship Company's transatlantic liner Empress of England. As Ocean Monarch, this unaltered ship promptly sailed for Australasia, to undertake two long cruises ex-Australia to Japan, timed to coincide with Expo'70. Upon her return to Britain, Ocean Monarch commenced a major refit to make her more suitable for full-time cruising. The now redundant cargo holds and associated handling gear were removed and the after part of the ship remodelled. This work enabling new public spaces and cabins to be built, which would increase passenger capacity to 1,372. Due to extended dockyard delays, Ocean Monarch was unable to resume service until October 1971. In the space of three years, Shaw Savill's passenger fleet had increased from two to six vessels, Southern Cross being the fleet's oldest.

Southern Cross was used for cruising from Southampton and Liverpool to Mediterranean ports from June 1971 onwards. Although her design was well suited for such duties, the ship was not fitted with private facilities in all cabins, which made her a challenging ship to market. Mainly due to Southern Cross's diminishing returns, after just five months of cruising, Shaw Savill decided to lay up the ship in November of the same year. The ship's early withdrawal proved to be her salvation as she escaped the poor maintenance which afflicted her fleet mates over the next few years resulting in them being sold for scrap by 1974 in spite of being younger than Southern Cross

=== 1973-1980 ===
After spending over a year laid up, first in Southampton and then at River Fal, Southern Cross was sold to Greece-based Ulysses Lines in January 1973. Renamed SS Calypso, the ship sailed to Piraeus where she was converted into a dedicated cruise ship. The original interior layout was retained with the exception of the indoor pool, which was replaced by a disco, whilst all interior furnishings were replaced with fashionable minimalist chrome-and-plastic creations, to conform with the then newest SOLAS regulations. Additionally, the cabins were refitted so that all now featured private bathrooms. This meant a slight reduction of passenger capacity, from the original 1,160 to 1,000.

Painted in cruise-like whites with an attractive blue/white funnel, Calypso entered service for Ulysses Lines in March 1975, initially cruising around the Mediterranean with Piraeus as the origin. After a few months she was chartered to the UK-based Thomson Cruises, to commence cruising from Tilbury and Southampton. Thomson withdrew from the cruise business in 1976 and Calypso returned to Ulysses Lines, who used her again in the Mediterranean, as well as for a season around South America in 1978-1979. Seven-night cruises from Miami to the Caribbean featured from 1979 onwards. At some point, Calypso also cruised from New York to Bermuda. In 1980 the ship was renamed SS Calypso I and used for cruises from Los Angeles to Alaska.

=== 1980-1991 ===
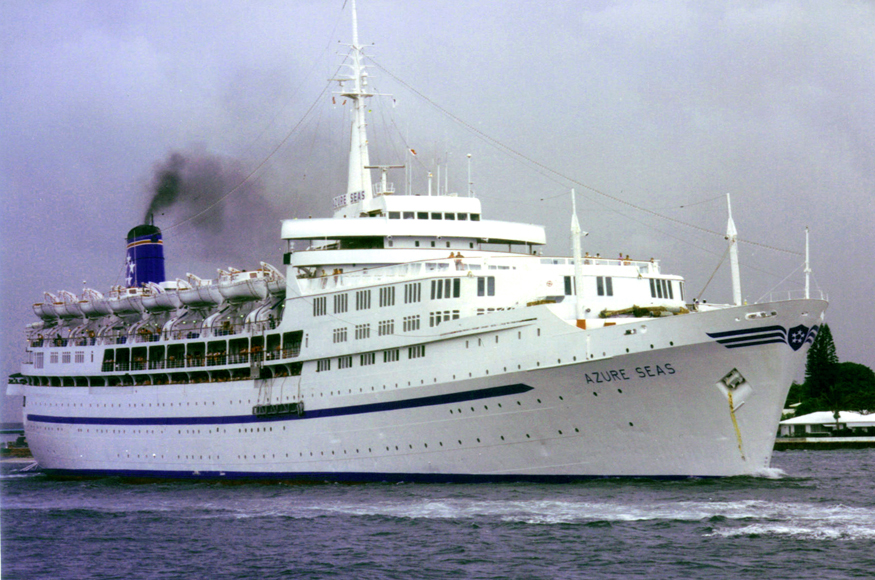
Azure Seas in Port Everglades, Florida in 1991

In late 1980 Calypso was sold again, this time to the United States–based Eastern Cruise Lines, who used her to start west-coast of US service under the name Western Cruise Lines. Renamed Azure Seas, the ship's interiors were redecorated once more to keep in the spirit of the times. In addition a new casino was built in place of the forward pool area. The ship's official passenger capacity was reduced to 821. With her funnel painted dark blue, Azure Seas was placed on three- and four-night cruises from Los Angeles to Ensenada and Catalina, and soon became highly popular.

In 1986 Western Cruise Lines and Eastern Cruise Lines merged with their west-coast competitor Sundance Cruises to form Admiral Cruises. No change was made to Azure Seas' itinerary, however. In the late 1980s the ship was again refurbished. This time the casino was moved to where the cinema balcony had been, with conference rooms and deluxe cabins built in place of the former casino. She continued her popular west-coast cruises until 1991, when transferred to cruising from Fort Laurendale to the Bahamas. However, in the same year Admiral Cruises was bought by Royal Caribbean Cruise Lines. The new owners had little interest in keeping the old Azure Seas in service, and she was sold to Dolphin Cruise Line.

=== 1991-2003 ===
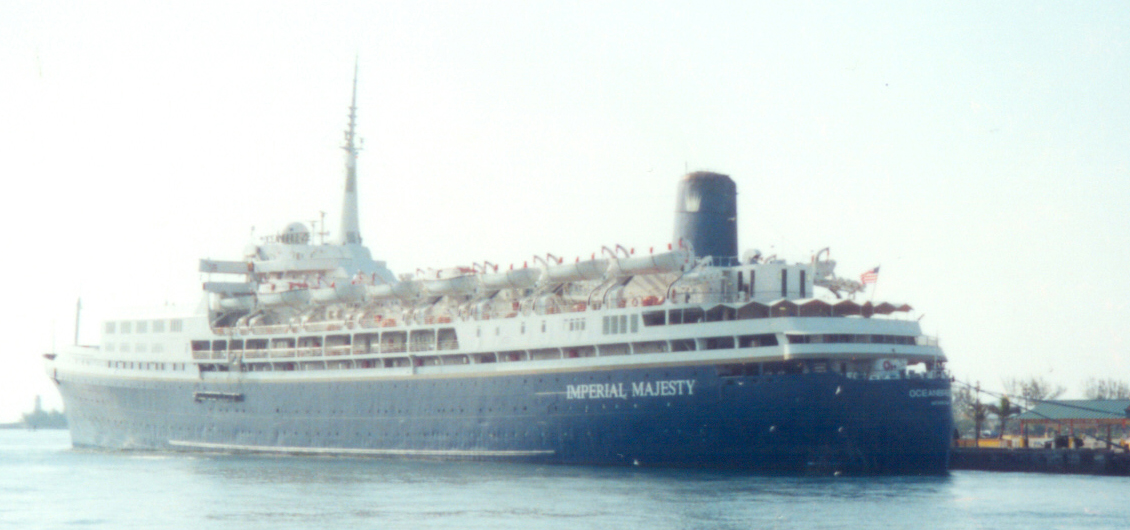
OceanBreeze docked in Nassau, Bahamas, 2000.

Renamed SS OceanBreeze and sporting a new white-funnelled livery with curving blue stripes along the hull, the now 36-year-old ship started cruising on a seven-night itinerary from Aruba in 1992. In 1996 OceanBreeze was moved to cruising from New York and Florida. Another change of ownership was in order for the ship in 1997 when Dolphin Cruise Line, Premier Cruises and Seawind Cruises merged to form Premier Cruise Line. OceanBreeze was re-painted in the new company's colours, with a dark-blue funnel and a blue-and-yellow hull, but otherwise her service continued as it had before.

In 1999, Premier Cruise Lines chartered OceanBreeze to the newly founded Imperial Majesty Cruises. Her old name, crew and hull colours were maintained, only the company name (on the hull) and the logo on the funnel was changed. Imperial Majesty placed OceanBreeze on two-night cruises from Fort Lauderdale to Nassau. The ship proved to be very popular on this route, and later in 1999 (some sources state early 2000) Imperial Majesty Cruises decided to buy her. In October 2000 she was remodeled at Newport News at the cost of $3,500,000 with more up to date interiors. OceanBreeze was expected by many to continue sailing until the new SOLAS-regulations came into effect in 2010, but this proved not to be, as OceanBreeze - while popular - was actually not at all well suited for the itinerary she was used for. Running a steam turbine–powered ship on two-night itineraries was highly expensive, and an additional $5 million would have been needed to convert the ship to conform to the Americans with Disabilities Act.

In addition to this the ship, not having bow thrusters, needed costly assistance from tugs every time she visited a port. When another more profitable lease agreement presented in June 2003 for the Regal Empress, being a less restrictive ship than the OceanBreeze, Imperial Majesty Cruises decided to sell OceanBreeze for scrap. A campaign entitled "save the Southern Cross" commenced immediately thereafter, but in spite of many offers of assistance and months of hard work by an Australian-based, she was beached on 5 November 2003 at the Ahmed Muztaba Steel Industries yard located approximately 18 kilometres from Chittagong, Bangladesh and broken up for scrap metal; by late 2004 the scrapping was completed.
