= SS Katoomba =

Australian interstate passenger liner and troop ship

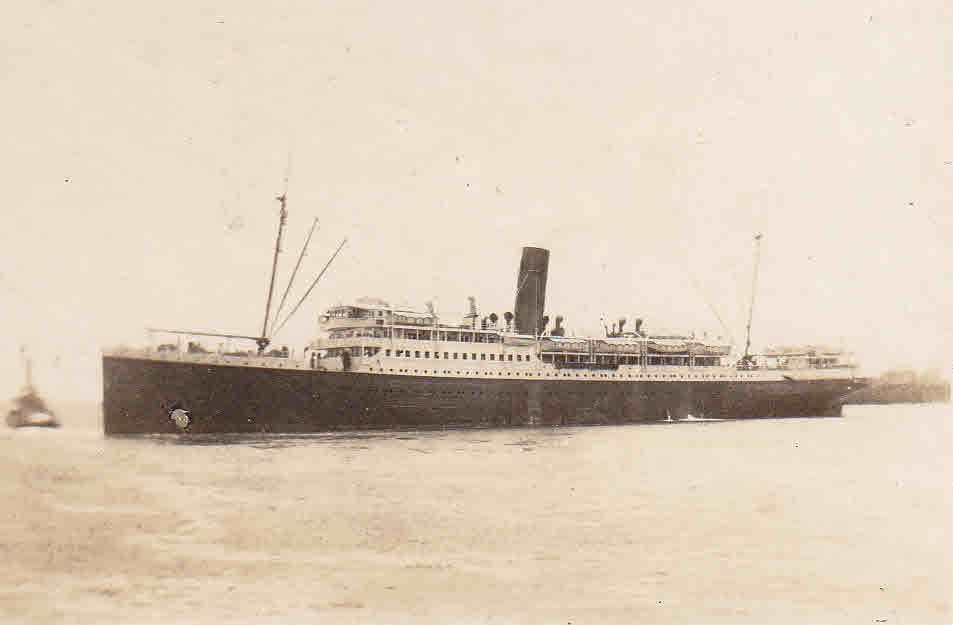
- Katoomba leaving Fremantle in 1926

History
- Name: 1913–49 Katoomba; 1949–59 Columbia
- Namesake: 1913–49 Katoomba, NSW; 1949–59 Columbia
- Owner: 1913–59 McIlwraith, McEacharn & Co; 1949–52 Cia. Maritima del Este SA; 1952–59 Neptune Shipping Co
- Operator: 1913–18, 1920–42, 1946–49 McIlwraith, McEacharn & Co; 1918–20 UK Government; 1942–46 Australian Government; 1949–59 Ormos Shipping Co
- Port of registry: 1913–49 (Australia) Melbourne; 1949–59 Panama City
- Route: 1913–18 Sydney – Fremantle; 1946–47 Piraeus – New York; 1947–49 France – French West Indies; 1950–57 Bremen – Montreal; 1957 Liverpool – Quebec
- Builder: Harland & Wolff, Belfast
- Yard number: 437
- Launched: 10 April 1913
- Completed: 10 July 1913
- Refit: 1920, 1946, 1949
- Identification: UK official number 132443; code letters JCPH (until 1933); call sign VHN (until 1933); pennant number D610 (1918–20); call sign VJDY (from 1934)
- Fate: Scrapped 1959

General characteristics
- Type: passenger ship
- Tonnage: 9,424 GRT, 5,499 NRT
- Length: 468 ft (143 m) length overall; 450.4 ft (137.3 m) registered length
- Beam: 60.3 ft (18.4 m)
- Draught: 26 ft 11 in (8.20 m)
- Depth: 34.2 ft (10.4 m)
- Decks: 2
- Propulsion: 2 × triple-expansion engines; 1 × low pressure turbine; 3 × screws
- Speed: cruising speed 15 knots (28 km/h); top speed 17 knots (31 km/h)
- Capacity: as built: 209 1st class, 192 2nd class, 156 3rd class passengers; 1949 refit: 52 1st class, 752 2nd class; cargo: included 8,650 cubic feet (245 m^{3}) refrigerated space
- Troops: about 2,000
- Crew: as built: 170

SS Katoomba was a passenger steamship that was built in Ireland 1913, spent most of her career in Australian ownership and was scrapped in Japan in 1959. McIlwraith, McEacharn & Co owned her for more than three decades, including two periods when she was a troopship. In 1946 the Goulandris brothers bought her for their Greek Line and registered her in Panama. In 1949 she was renamed Columbia.

In Australian civilian service Katoomba mostly worked scheduled coastal routes, initially between Sydney and Fremantle. For Greek Line she mostly worked transatlantic routes between Europe and North America, and her passengers included European emigrants. Between 1947 and 1949 Compagnie Générale Transatlantique (CGT) chartered her for service between France and the French West Indies.

The ship was refitted in 1920, 1946 and 1949. She was a coal-burner until her 1949 refit, when she was converted to burn oil. Columbia was damaged by fires in 1952 and 1957 and a collision in 1956. She was laid up from 1957 and scrapped in 1959.

== Building ==
Harland & Wolff built Katoomba on slipway number 6 of its Belfast shipyard. Her yard number was 437. She was launched on 10 April 1913 and delivered to McIlwraith, McEacharn & Co on 10 July.

Her length overall was 468 ft (143 m), her registered length was 450.4 ft (137.3 m), her beam was 60.3 ft (18.4 m) and her depth was 34.2 ft (10.4 m). Her tonnages were 9,424 GRT and 5,499 NRT. As built, she was worked by a crew of 170 and had berths for 557 passengers: 209 first class, 192 second class and 156 third class. She had four cargo holds, and they included 8,650 cubic feet (245 m^{3}) of refrigerated space for perishable goods. In her forepart she had space to carry livestock.

Katoomba was propelled by what was called "combination machinery". She had three screws, a pair of four-cylinder triple-expansion steam engines and a single low-pressure steam turbine. The reciprocating engines drove her port and starboard screws. Exhaust steam from their low-pressure cylinders powered the turbine, which drove her middle screw. Between them the three engines gave her a service speed of 15 knots (28 km/h).

McIlwraith, McEacharn registered Katoomba in Melbourne. Her United Kingdom official number was 132443 and her code letters were JCPH. She was equipped for wireless telegraphy, operated by the Marconi Company. Until 1933 her call sign was VHN.

== Early civilian service ==
McIlwraith, McEacharn's senior Captain, Lionel Moodie Heddle, had supervised Katoomba's building. He commanded her on her maiden voyage from the UK to Australia and remained her master for 23 years, in both civilian and military service.

Katoomba began her maiden voyage by embarking passengers in Glasgow Scotland. They included a small party who disembarked when she briefly anchored in Plymouth Sound, England, and 237 passengers who were bound for Australia. On 11 August she reached Durban in South Africa for bunkering. Between Durban and Fremantle Katoomba fired all six of her boilers and reached speeds of more than 17 knots (31 km/h).

Katoomba reached Fremantle on 24 August, Port Phillip on 29 August and docked in Melbourne the next morning. On 13 September she left Melbourne for Sydney, where on 18 September she was opened to news reporters and invited guests They were entertained by the "Katoomba Ladies Orchestra", which was in fact a chamber quartet of one pianist, two violinists and one singer. On 20 September Katoomba began scheduled service between Sydney and Fremantle via Melbourne and Adelaide.

== World War I troop ship ==
During World War I Katoomba remained in civilian service until May 1918, when the Imperial Transport Department of the UK government requisitioned her and gave her the pennant number D610. She sailed from Australia across the Pacific Ocean, through the Panama Canal to New York, where she embarked US troops to take to Europe. She made a second transatlantic crossing bringing US troops to Britain, and was then transferred to the Mediterranean.

When the Armistice of 11 November 1918 was signed Katoomba was in Salonika. She then became the first British troop ship to pass through the Dardanelles since the Ottoman entry into World War I in 1914. On 14 November 1918 Katoomba left Istanbul carrying more than 2,000 troops of the Essex and Middlesex regiments and 26 released Allied prisoners of war whom the Ottoman Army had captured in 1916 at the siege of Kut. She made six round trips, repatriating a total of 14,000 British and Empire troops in one direction and Turks in the other. She visited Bombay in April 1919, then Britain, and in August returned to Australia, where she was returned to her owners.

== Inter–war passenger service ==
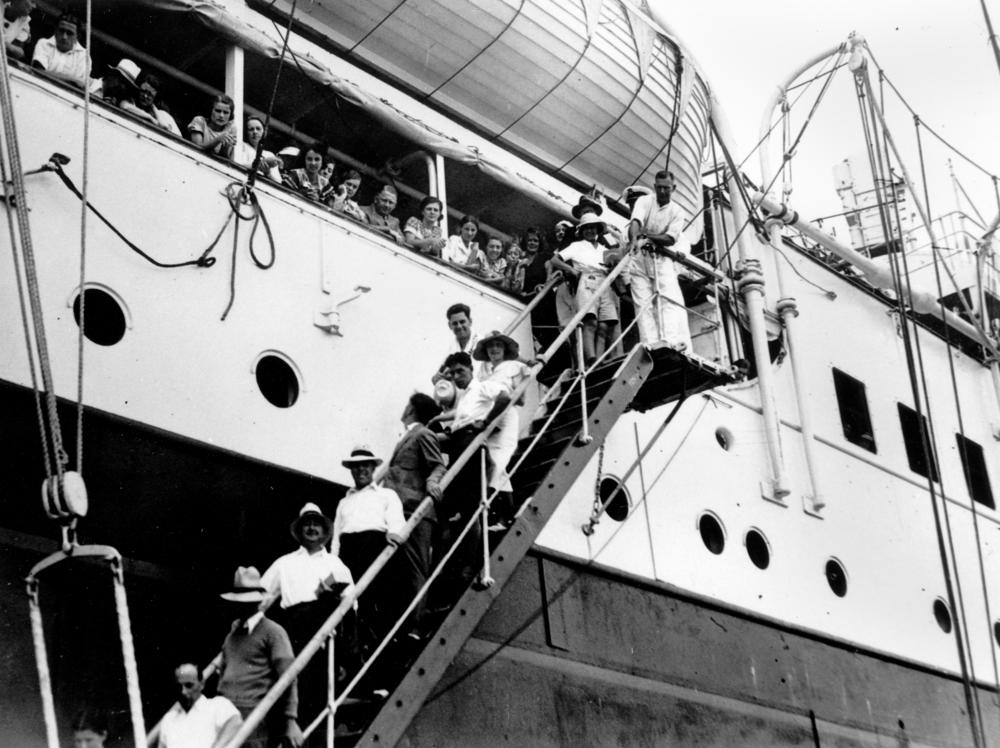
Passengers disembarking from Katoomba in 1933

In 1920 Katoomba was refitted and returned to civilian service in Australian coastal waters. In 1934 the four-letter call sign VJDY superseded Katoomba's code letters and original three-letter call sign.

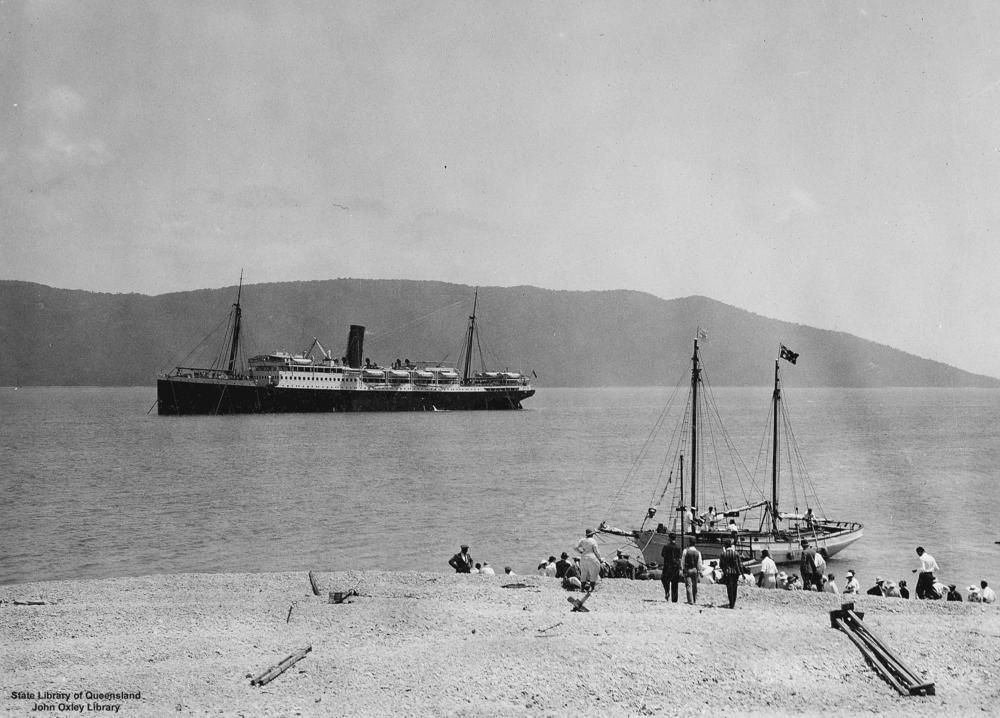
Katoomba anchored off Daydream Island in 1935

In the 1930s Katoomba undertook some Pacific cruises that proved very popular. In October 1935 she took more than 430 Methodists and Queen Sālote Tupou III of Tonga from Sydney to Fiji.

== World War II service ==
Katoomba remained in civilian service in the early years of World War II until early 1941, when she was briefly requisitioned to take 1,496 troops from Brisbane to Rabaul, and then 687 troops from Sydney to Darwin. She was then returned to civilian service.

When Japan attacked Pearl Harbor and other targets in the Pacific (Australian date 8 December 1941), Katoomba was taking troops to Rabaul and being escorted by HMAS Adelaide. In response to the attacks Katoomba was held at Port Moresby, then abandoned her trip to Rabaul and joined other ships evacuating civilians from New Guinea, Papua and Darwin.

In February 1942 Katoomba was again requisitioned as a troop ship. A USAAF fighter group's ground troops and crated Curtiss P-40 Warhawk aircraft was bound for Ceylon aboard the troop ship Mariposa, in convoy with USS Phoenix and USAT Willard A. Holbrook. However, when the convoy reached Australia, Mariposa' was withdrawn and Katoomba and another Australian troop ship, Duntroon, were substituted.

Duntroon, Katoomba and Willard A. Holbrook left Melbourne on 12 February. They reached Fremantle, where they joined USS Langley and Sea Witch with aircraft for Java and formed Convoy MS 5. The convoy left Fremantle on 22 February, and Langley and Sea Witch later left the convoy to continue to Java. HMS Enterprise met MS 5 about 300 nautical miles (560 km) west of Cocos Island on 28 February and escorted it to Colombo, where the convoy arrived on 5 March.

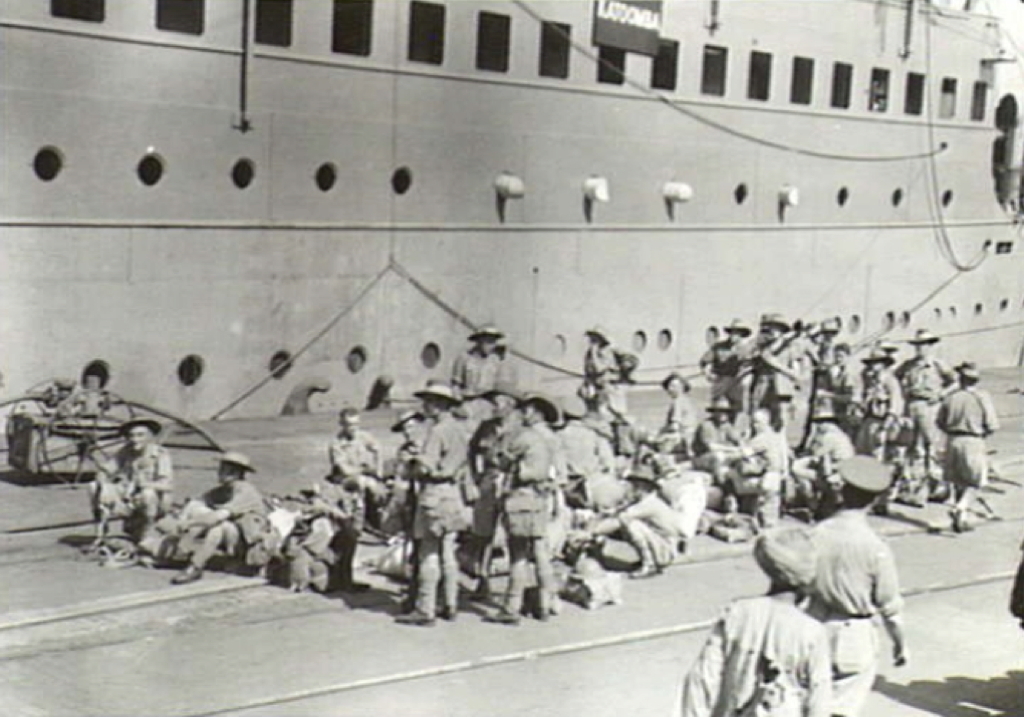
Troops of the Second AIF at Bombay 25 March 1942, waiting to embark aboard Katoomba to Australia

From Colombo Katoomba sailed to India, called at Karachi and then embarked 640 troops in Bombay. They were members of the Second Australian Imperial Force (Second AIF) who had served in the Middle East and were being redeployed to the south west Pacific. Katoomba left Bombay on 4 April, called at Colombo and Mauritius, reached Fremantle on 7 May and then continued via Adelaide to Sydney.

On 4 August 1942 Katoomba was again sailing from Fremantle to Adelaide when she survived being shelled by a submarine about 300 nautical miles (560 km) off Albany, Western Australia.

In August 1943 Katoomba was in Port Moresby when a sling of ammunition fell into one of her holds, causing an explosion that started a fire. Her Chief Officer, JS Burns and three able seamen volunteered to enter the hold and fight the fire, despite the danger that it could detonate ammunition in the hold. In January 1945 Winston Dugan, acting Governor-General of Australia, announced that the four men were to be commended.

In November 1945 Katoomba was delayed in Brisbane for three weeks, as her 40 stokers refused to sail because they were two men short. On 19 November she left Brisbane for Bougainville Island to repatriate Australian troops. A letter was published, allegedly written after a meeting of 3,000 AIF and RAAF personnel on Bougainville awaiting repatriation, threatening that when Katoomba reached Torokina harbour all the stokers would be thrown overboard. On 27 November the ship called at Townsville, where the stokers asked for the Army Minister Frank Forde and Air Minister Arthur Drakeford to guarantee their safety.

== Post-war civilian service ==
In 1946 Katoomba was returned to her owners. That July the Goulandris brothers bought her for their Compañía Maritima del Este subsidiary. Goulandris brothers' Ormos Shipping Company, which traded as Greek Line, managed her. On 6 October Katoomba left Woolloomooloo, carrying 130 released Italian prisoners of war to be repatriated. She reached Genoa, where she was quickly refitted and her funnel was repainted in Greek Line colours.

Greek Line put Katoomba on the route between Piraeus and New York via Genoa and Oran. From 1947 until 1949 CGT chartered her and she sailed between France and the French West Indies. In 1949 Katoomba was again refitted in Genoa. She was converted from coal to oil-burning, she was renamed Columbia, and her passenger accommodation was increased to carry 804 passengers: 52 first class and 752 second class.

After her refit and renaming, Columbia made one more trip to the Caribbean. Then on 25 November she left Genoa for Australia, reaching Fremantle on 17 December and Sydney on 26 December. From June 1950 she served Greek Line's route between Bremen and Montreal. In 1952 a fire damaged her in Bremerhaven. In 1954 Goulandris brothers transferred Columbia's ownership to another subsidiary, the Neptune Shipping Company.

On 18 August 1956 Columbia was in port at Quebec when the bow of Home Lines' 13,152 GRT Homeric struck her in fog. Tugs were towing Homeric at the time. 20 feet (6 m) of Columbia's starboard side was damaged, and some of her lifeboats were crushed. Greek Line arranged for her to be repaired in Bremerhaven.

In 1957 Columbia was transferred to the route between Liverpool and Quebec. However, in August she was again damaged by fire. On 21 October Greek Line withdrew her and laid her up at Bremerhaven.

In March 1958 Columbia was moved to Piraeus, where she remained laid up until August 1959, when she sailed for Japan to be scrapped. On 29 September she reached Nagasaki to be broken up.

== Bibliography ==
- Emmons, Frederick (1973). Pacific Liners 1927–72. Newton Abbot: David & Charles. ISBN 978-0715360750.
- Gill, G Hermon (1957). Royal Australian Navy 1939–1942. Australia in the War of 1939–1945. Series 2 – Navy. Vol. 1. Canberra: Australian War Memorial. LCCN 58037940. Archived from the original on 25 May 2009.
- The Marconi Press Agency Ltd (1914). The Year Book of Wireless Telegraphy and Telephony. London: The Marconi Press Agency Ltd.
- Plowman, Peter (2007). Coast to Coast, the Great Australian Coastal Liners. Dural, NSW: Rosenberg Publishing. ISBN 978-1877058608.
