= TSMS Lakonia =

Dutch-built ocean liner that caught fire and sank in 1963

- An early photo of Johan van Oldenbarnevelt

History

Netherlands
- Name: Johan van Oldenbarnevelt
- Namesake: Johan van Oldenbarnevelt
- Owner: Netherland Line
- Operator: Netherland Line 1930–39; Holland America Line 1939–45; Netherland Line 1946–63
- Port of registry: Amsterdam (1930–39); Batavia (1940–43); Willemstad (1944 onward)
- Route: Amsterdam – Dutch East Indies (1930–39); Batavia – New York (1939–41)
- Builder: NSM, Amsterdam
- Yard number: 194
- Launched: 3 August 1929
- Completed: 13 March 1930
- Decommissioned: 3 February 1963
- Refit: 1941 as troop ship; 1946 as ocean liner; 1951; 1958; 1963 as cruise ship
- Identification: Code letters PGHB (until 1933); Call sign PFEB (1934 onward)
- Fate: Sold to the Shipping Investment Corporation and renamed TSMS Lakonia

Greece
- Name: Lakonia
- Owner: Shipping Investment Corporation
- Operator: Greek Line
- Port of registry: Greece
- Acquired: 8 March 1963
- Fate: Damaged by fire at sea 22–24 December 1963 and sank while under tow 29 December 1963

General characteristics
- Type: Ocean liner
- Tonnage: 19,040 GRT
- Length: 586.2 ft (178.7 m)
- Beam: 74.8 ft (22.8 m)
- Depth: 36.1 ft (11.0 m)
- Decks: 4
- Installed power: 1,555 NHP
- Propulsion: Twin Sulzer diesel engines, Two propellers
- Speed: 19 kn (35 km/h; 22 mph)
- Capacity: As built: 770 passengers: 366 first class; 280 second class; 64 third class; 60 fourth class; cargo: 9,000 tons
- Notes: sister ship: Marnix van St. Aldegonde

TSMS Lakonia was an ocean liner that was launched in 1929 for Netherland Line as the ocean liner Johan van Oldenbarnevelt. In 1962 she became the Greek Line cruise ship TSMS Lakonia. On 22 December 1963 she caught fire at sea and on 29 December she sank. 128 people were killed in the disaster.

In the 1930s Johan van Oldenbarnevelt's regular route was between Amsterdam and the Dutch East Indies. She served in the Second World War as an Allied troop ship. She was refitted several times and latterly became a cruise ship.

In 1962 Netherland Line sold her to a Greek company, the Shipping Investment Corporation, who renamed her Lakonia and for whom the Greek Line managed her for cruising. From April 1963 Greek Line operated her on cruises from Southampton.

On 22 December 1963 fire broke out on the ship when she was about 200 miles (320 km) north of Madeira during a Christmas cruise. As the fire spread, alarms sounded too softly to be heard by most people aboard. Evacuation was hampered by the overcrowding of lifeboats and the loss of several boats to fire. Some deaths were caused by the fire itself, others by accidents when abandoning ship, and others by exposure or drowning in the sea.

Lakonia's crew successfully launched just over half of her lifeboats. Some passengers were able to reach the water via gangways and rope ladders. Two ships alerted by distress signals managed to save most of the others.

On 24 December ocean tugs took Lakonia in tow and tried to tow her to Gibraltar. But the ship had developed a list and on 29 December she sank in the Atlantic.

A board of inquiry determined the fire to be due to faulty electrical wiring and strongly criticised the maintenance of equipment, thoroughness of lifeboat drills, and the standard of supervision. Eight of the ship's officers were charged with negligence.

== Building ==
Nederlandsche Scheepsbouw Maatschappij built Johan van Oldenbarnevelt in Amsterdam. Her yard number was 194. She was launched on 3 August 1929 and completed on 13 March 1930. The same shipyard built a sister ship, Marnix van St. Aldegonde, which was launched in December 1929 and completed in September 1930. Both ships were built for Netherland Line to operate scheduled passenger and cargo services between Amsterdam and the Dutch East Indies.

Johan van Oldenbarnevelt was named after a Dutch soldier and statesman of the same name who was beheaded in 1619.

Johan van Oldenbarnevelt was a motor ship with two Sulzer marine diesel engines driving her two propellers. Between them the engines developed 1,555 NHP and gave her a cruising speed of 19 knots (35 km/h). The ship was 586.2 ft (178.7 m) long, had a beam of 74.8 ft (22.8 m) and her tonnage was 19,040 GRT.

Johan van Oldenbarnevelt was the 89th ship built for the Netherland Line. When she was launched she was the largest ship yet built in the Netherlands. The artist Carel Adolph Lion Cachet and sculptor Lambertus Zijl decorated her interior with teak, marble, and many statues, mosaics, tapestries and chandeliers.

As built, she had berths for 770 passengers: 366 in first class, 280 in second, 64 in third and 60 in fourth class. She had berths for 360 crew. She had four decks and could carry 9,000 tons of cargo.

Until 1933 the ship's code letters were PGHB. In 1934 they were superseded by the maritime call sign PFEB. Until 1939 she was registered in Amsterdam.

== Johan van Oldenbarnevelt ==
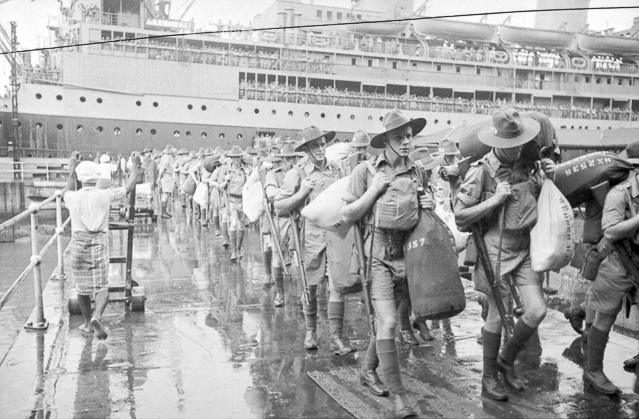
Members of 'C' Company, 2/30th Battalion disembark at Singapore, from Johan Van Oldenbarnevelt (HMT FF), part of Convoy US11B, 15 August 1941.

=== World War II service ===
When the Second World War broke out in 1939, Holland America Line chartered Johan van Oldenbarnevelt, re-registered her in Batavia in the Dutch East Indies and used her as a cargo ship between Batavia and New York City.

On 20 January 1941 she was requisitioned to be an Allied troop ship, and was converted by Harland and Wolff to carry up to 4,000 troops. Orient Line managed her. In 1943 she was re-registered in Willemstad, Curaçao. After servicing India, Singapore and Penang, she finally returned to her home port of Amsterdam on 13 February 1946.

Her sister ship, Marnix van St. Aldegonde, also served as a troop ship. German aircraft sank her by torpedo off the Algerian coast, but all 3,000 troops and crew were saved by rescue ships.

=== Post-war service ===
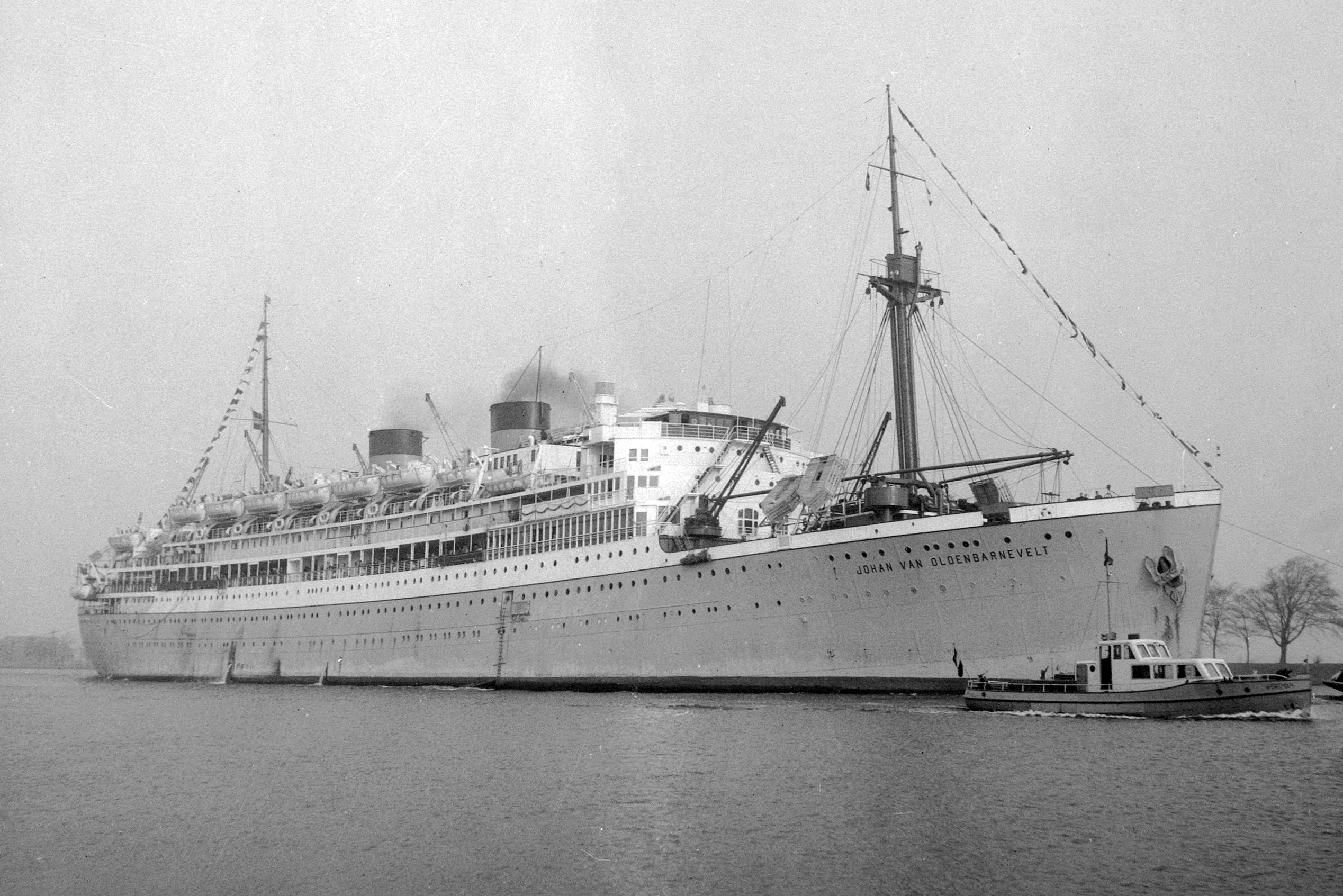
Johan van Oldenbarnevelt arriving in Amsterdam, 15 February 1948

After Johan van Oldenbarnevelt was released from government service, Netherland Line had her refitted and in 1946 returned her to service on the Amsterdam – Batavia route. From 1945 until 1949 Indonesians fought for their independence from the Netherlands. For several years the ship ferried Dutch troops returning home from Indonesia.

By 1950 Indonesia was independent and the ship was withdrawn from the East Indies service. She was transferred to the Amsterdam – Australia service and began her first voyage to Australia on 2 September 1950. She serviced Australia and New Zealand for the next twelve and a half years, with occasional service to Canada and the United States.

The Australia run was an instant success, and 1951, Johan van Oldenbarnevelt was put into dry-dock in Amsterdam for refitting. She was refitted as a one-class ship with berths for 1,414 passengers. Her lounges were restored to their original and additional passenger facilities were installed. Eight lifeboats were added, bringing her total number of boats to 24.

On 23 January 1952 she left for Australia but was forced to return to Amsterdam after four small fires were discovered aboard. The fires were quickly extinguished. Arson was suspected, but no suspects were ever arrested.

In 1958 Johan van Oldenbarnevelt was refitted again, reducing her berths to 1,210. The Amsterdam Dry Dock Company completed the refit in three months at a cost of A$800,000. Three luxury suites were added, as well as a nightclub, cinema, gift shop, promenade lounge and second swimming pool. All public rooms were refinished and restored. Her main mast was moved to atop the bridge, and her decks were extended aft. Her funnels were raised, given rounded tops and painted yellow and black. Her black hull was re-painted grey.

On 2 April 1959 the ship was assigned to her new port, Southampton, England. She offered round-the-world service, making stops in Australia, New Zealand, Bermuda and New York City. She was now a cruise ship instead of an ocean liner.

Johan van Oldenbarnevelt left on her last round-the-world voyage for the Netherland Line on 30 June 1962. She arrived in Sydney, Australia on 3 February 1963 and was decommissioned by the Netherland Line that day, ending a 33-year career for that shipping line. She then sailed for Genoa, Italy, and arrived on 7 March 1963.

== TSMS Lakonia ==
On 8 March 1963 Johan van Oldenbarnevelt was sold to a Greek company, the Shipping Investment Corporation. Her decks and public rooms were renamed and the aft swimming pool was enlarged. 12 extra cabins were added, and air conditioning was installed throughout the ship. Her hull was painted white, and her tonnage increased to 20,314 GRT. She was renamed TSMS Lakonia.

Ormos Shipping Company, also known as the Greek Line, operated Lakonia offering cruises from Southampton to the Canary Islands. She left Southampton on her first voyage as Lakonia on 24 April 1963. She proved very popular, and Greek Line planned 27 cruises for 1964. From 9–13 December 1963 she underwent another minor upgrade. A new pneumatic fuel injection system was installed. Cabins were redecorated, and the kitchen and pantry were completely remodelled.

Lakonia was fitted with a number of safety features. She carried 24 lifeboats capable of holding 1,455 people. She had an automatic fire alarm system and two fire stations with specialist firefighting equipment. She had lifejackets for every person aboard and an extra 400 stowed on deck.

=== Fire ===
Aerial photo of Lakonia burning

Lakonia left Southampton on 19 December 1963 for an 11-day Christmas cruise of the Canary Islands. Her first scheduled stop was to be the island of Madeira. She carried 646 passengers and 376 crew: a total of 1,022 people. All but 21 of the passengers were British citizens. Most of her crew were Greek or German. The captain of Lakonia was 53-year-old Mathios Zarbis.

The crew had conducted a boat drill a week before, and the ship passed a safety inspection by the British Ministry of Transport 24 hours before sailing. She carried a Greek certificate of seaworthiness. Passengers took part in a boat drill on 20 December, but one passenger noted that he was the only one at his lifeboat Station.

On 22 December, at around 11:00 p.m., a steward noticed thick smoke seeping under the door of the ship's hairdressing salon. Upon opening the door, he found the room completely ablaze, and the fire rushed into the hallway toward the state rooms. He and another steward tried to fight the flames with fire extinguishers, but the fire spread too fast to be contained. One of the men ran to notify the ship's purser, Antonio Bogetti.

Fire alarms sounded, but too softly to be heard by most passengers. "The fire alarm bell was so weak that it sounded like someone calling the waiter to ask for tea," one survivor later told reporters. An alarm went off on the bridge, showing the fire's location. The ship was about 200 miles (320 km) north of Madeira at 35°15′N 15°15′W.

At the time the fire was discovered, most of the passengers were in the ship's ballroom, called the Lakonia Room, dancing at the "Tropical Tramps' Ball." Passengers began to notice the smell of smoke, but most dismissed it as strong cigar smoke. Captain Zarbis, who had been notified of the fire, tried to make an announcement on the ship's public address system, but the fire had disabled it. As smoke began to fill the ballroom at about 11:30, the band stopped playing and cruise director George Herbert ushered the frightened passengers to the boat deck. The upper deck was ablaze within 10 minutes.

Many of the passengers who had been asleep in their cabins found themselves unable to escape the fire. Some passengers were told to go to the main dining room to await instructions, but most ignored this order, since the dining room lay directly in the path of the fire.

At 11:30 p.m., the ship's chief radio officer Antonios Kalogridis sent out the first distress call: "Fire spreading up. Prepare evacuation on ship." At midnight, a second distress call was sent out: "We are leaving the ship. Please immediately give us assistance. Please help us." Kalogridis sent out the last call at 12:22 a.m., just before the radio room caught fire: "SOS from Lakonia, last time. I cannot stay anymore in the radio station. We are leaving the ship. Please immediate assistance. Please help."

A six-man fire crew tried to fight the blaze, but the fire spread too quickly to be contained. Boilers began to explode, filling the rooms and hallways with thick, black smoke, and the suffocating passengers were forced on deck.

=== Evacuation ===
The ship's purser gave the order to abandon ship shortly before 1:00 a.m. Dazed passengers made their way to the lifeboats, some in their pajamas and others still wearing their jewelry and evening wear.

A few crew members went below decks to try to save passengers from their burning cabins. The ship's swimming pool attendant and a steward lowered themselves over the side of the ship, by rope, to pull trapped people from portholes.

Evacuation of the ship was very difficult. Some lifeboats burned before they could be lowered. Two of the lifeboats were swamped, spilling their occupants into the sea; one when it was lowered only by one end, and the other when its davits broke off. Chains had rusted in many of the davits, making boats difficult or impossible to move. Only just over half of the lifeboats made it safely away from Lakonia, and some of them less than half full. Several people who dove overboard struck the side of the ship on the way down, which killed them before they hit the water.

Passengers were angered when the radio operator left the ship in a launch, with a nurse and two musicians. Kalogridis later testified that he had left to rescue people from the water. He stated that he did not return to the ship because the current pushed the launch away. Passengers also claimed that some of the crewmen took advantage of the chaos to loot state rooms.

When all of the boats were away, there were still people in the water and over 100 people left aboard the burning ship. Lakonia continued to burn fiercely and was rocked by violent explosions. Those who remained aboard flocked to the glass-enclosed Agora Shopping Centre at the stern of the ship. After several hours, the flames closed in on them, and they were forced to descend ropes and rope ladders into the ocean. The port and starboard gangways were lowered as well, and people walked down the gangways single file into the sea.

=== Rescue ===
At 3:30 a.m., four hours after the first distress call, the 495-foot (151 m) Argentine passenger ship Salta arrived on the scene. Salta, commanded by Captain José Barrere, had been on her way from Genoa, Italy to Buenos Aires. The 440-foot (130 m) British cargo ship Montcalm arrived half an hour later at 4:00 a.m. The majority of the survivors were saved by these two ships. Salta rescued 475 people and took aboard most of Lakonia's lifeboats.

In the hours that followed, the Belgian ship Charlesville, the USA freighter Rio Grande, the British passenger ship Stratheden and the Panamanian freighter Mehdi all arrived to join the rescue. Each rescue ship launched boats to pluck survivors from the water. The United States Air Force sent four C-54 aircraft from the Lajes Field in the Azores. The planes dropped flares, lifejackets, life rafts and survival kits to people in the water. An RAF Avro Shackleton from Gibraltar criss-crossed the area, pinpointing boats and survivors and guiding rescuers to them.

The rescue was hindered by the fact that Lakonia drifted for several miles during the evacuation. People in the water were dispersed over a 2-to-3 mi (3.2-to-4.8 km) area. Also, rescue ships were reluctant to get too near Lakonia because of the risk that her 500 tons of fuel oil could explode.

Charlesville sent a lifeboat shortly after daybreak to rescue Captain Zarbis, who was spotted pacing the decks of his still-burning ship. Zarbis was the last person to leave Lakonia alive.

Most of the survivors were taken to Madeira. Others, including Captain Zarbis, were taken to Casablanca.

=== Aftermath ===
The disaster killed a total of 128 people. 95 were passengers and 33 were crew. Only 53 people were killed in the actual fire. The rest died from exposure, drowning and injuries sustained while diving overboard. Most of the dead were buried in a Gibraltar cemetery after an autopsy which was carried out in a cavern workshop of 1st Fortress Squadron, Royal Engineers.

One passenger who jumped from the ship cut her throat on her life jacket. After being rescued by Montcalm, her injuries were treated by another passenger, Alan Leigh. Largely due to this incident, cruise ship passengers are now instructed how to hold their jackets if jumping from a height.

Crewmen from the Royal Navy aircraft carrier HMS Centaur boarded Lakonia on 24 December, once the flames had died down. Most of the bodies were recovered by the crew of Centaur. By this time Lakonia was a charred, smoking hulk. Her superstructure had partially collapsed amidships, and the bridge and aft decks had caved in. There were holes blasted near her bow, and she was listing 10 degrees to starboard.

The Norwegian tugboat Herkules secured a tow line to Lakonia at 5:30 p.m. on 24 December. Herkules, along with the Portuguese tugboat Praia da Adraga and two other tugs, set off for the British base at Gibraltar with Lakonia in tow. Her list grew more severe each day, and at about 2:00 p.m. on 29 December, Lakonia rolled onto her starboard side. She sank stern-first in only three minutes. The ship went down 230 nmi (430 km) southwest of Lisbon, Portugal, 250 nmi (460 km) west of Gibraltar.

The only colour photographs taken of the Lakonia disaster ran in Life magazine on 3 January 1964. Life's photographic coverage of the event marked only the second time in history that a publication was able to offer hour-by-hour photographic coverage of a disaster at sea. The first such coverage appeared on 6 August 1956, when Life ran a series of photos of the Italian liner Andrea Doria sinking. The only person known to have taken photos aboard the ship during the fire was Ian Harris from Finchley, London, who was travelling with his wife, Rita Harris. These photos appeared in Life, edition dated 3 January 1964. Rita Harris recounted the events on 2 July 1964 on Woman's Hour on the BBC Light Programme.

=== Investigation ===
The Greek Merchant Marine Ministry conducted a two-year investigation into Lakonia disaster. The board of inquiry maintained that Lakonia should not have passed safety inspections before sailing. Lifeboat davits were rusted and lockers containing lifesaving equipment failed to open. The drain holes in many of the lifeboats lacked stoppers, so that passengers had to constantly bail water.

The crew had conducted a lifeboat drill a week before the voyage, but only five of the boats had been lowered. The board argued that all of the boats should have been tested.

Charges of looting were dropped after extensive questioning. The crew maintained that they had only broken into cabins to search for lifejackets.

The board of inquiry made a number of other charges. The order to abandon ship was given too late. Operations on deck were not supervised by responsible officers. The crew, except for a few acts of self-sacrifice, failed to rescue sleeping passengers from their cabins below decks.

Eight of Lakonia's officers were charged with negligence. Captain Zarbis, his first officer and the ship's security officer were charged with gross negligence. The other five men were charged with simple negligence.

The cause of the fire was ultimately determined to be a short circuit of faulty electrical wiring.

== See also ==
- List of maritime disasters

== Notes ==
1. The reported position is about 200 statute miles from the main island of Madeira: about 175 nautical miles; roughly NNE (028°T).
2. This is a puzzling explanation to offer, as the effect of any current would be the same on both vessels. Whatever the strength and direction of current, it would have no tendency to separate launch and ship.

== Citations ==
- Burca, Richard (June 1964). "A Holiday I'll Never Forget". Reader's Digest: 64–68.
