= MS Regal Empress =

Ship built in 1953

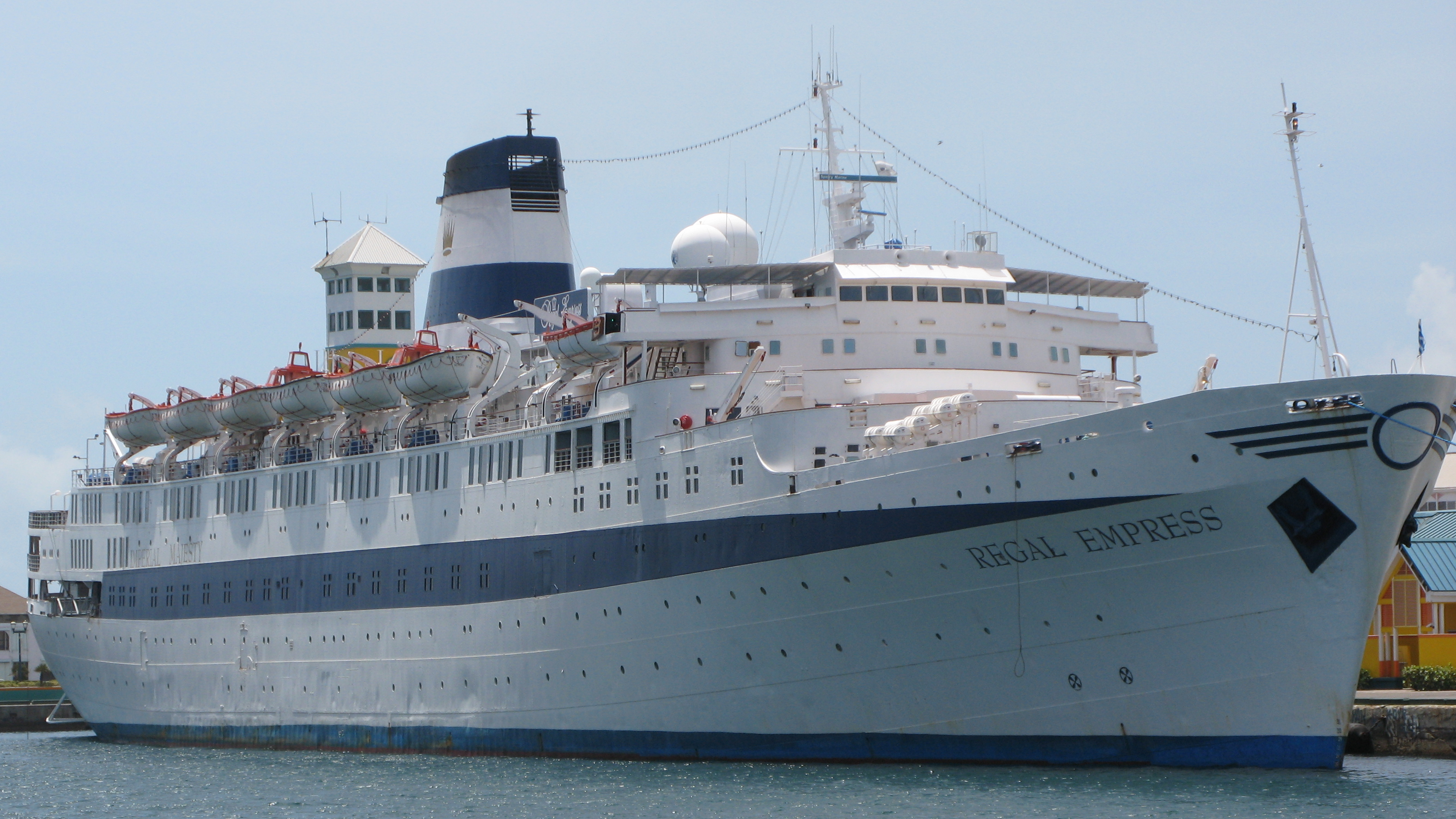
- Regal Empress at Nassau in 2008.

History
- Name: 1953–1981: SS Olympia; 1981–1983: SS Caribe; 1983–1993: MS Caribe I; 1993–2009: MS Regal Empress
- Owner: 1953–1974: Greek Line; 1974–1981: Unknown; 1981–1985: Sally Shipping; 1985–1993: Olympia Caribbean Shipping Co; 1993–2004: Regal Cruise Line; 2004–2009: Celebration Cruise Holdings
- Operator: 1953–1974: Greek Line; 1974–1983: laid up/rebuilt; 1983–1993: Commodore Cruise Line; 1993–2003: Regal Cruise Line; 2003–2009: Imperial Majesty Cruise Line
- Port of registry: 1953–1968: Monrovia, Liberia; 1968–1981: Andros, Greece; 1981–1983: Hamburg, West Germany; 1983–1993: Panama, Panama; 1993–2009: Nassau, Bahamas
- Builder: Alexander Stephen & Sons, Glasgow, Scotland
- Yard number: 636
- Launched: 16 April 1953
- Christened: 12 October 1953
- Completed: 1953
- Maiden voyage: 15 October 1953
- In service: 15 October 1953
- Out of service: 9 March 2009
- Identification: IMO number: 5262835; Bahaman call sign: C6LW2
- Fate: Scrapped in 2009

General characteristics (as built)
- Tonnage: 22,979 GRT
- Length: 611 ft (186 m)
- Draught: 28 ft (8.5 m)
- Decks: 10
- Installed power: Parsons steam turbines
- Propulsion: Two propellers
- Speed: 21 knots (39 km/h; 24 mph)
- Capacity: 138 First class, 1,169 Tourist class passengers

General characteristics (after 1983 refit)
- Tonnage: 21,909 GRT
- Installed power: Two Klockner-Humboldt-Deutz diesel engines
- Speed: 18 knots (33 km/h; 21 mph)
- Capacity: 1,475 passengers
- Crew: 900

MS Regal Empress was a cruise ship most recently operated for Imperial Majesty Cruise Line until being retired in 2009 and scrapped in 2010. She was built in 1953 by Alexander Stephen & Sons at Glasgow, Scotland as the ocean liner SS Olympia for the Greek Line. Greek Line withdrew the Olympia from service in 1974. Following an extended lay-up period and reconstruction into a diesel-engined Caribbean cruise ship, the ship re-emerged in 1983 as MS Caribe I for Commodore Cruise Line. In 1993 she was sold to Regal Cruise Line and received her final name. She operated for Imperial Majesty Cruise Line from 2003 until 2009. The Regal Empress was also the last vintage passenger ship to regularly sail from the United States.

== Service history ==
One of the longest serving passenger ships in history, and the only ship expressly built for the Greek Line was initially named Olympia. Olympia was completed by Alexander Stephen & Sons, on the River Clyde, in 1953. She was initially measured at 22,979 gross register tons (GRT), and carried 138 First Class, and 1169 Tourist Class passengers. She was registered in Liberia. Parsons turbines of 25,000 shaft horsepower (19,000 kW) drove her at a service speed of 21 knots (39 km/h; 24 mph) (23 knots, 43 km/h, 26 mph maximum). The maiden voyage left Glasgow for Liverpool and New York City on 20 October 1953. Her first voyage on the intended route from Piraeus to New York City as an ocean liner did not take place until March 1955 due to legal complications. In 1961, the route was extended to Haifa, Israel. Her voyages to New York usually included numerous intermediary stops. Olympia was a frequent caller with immigrant families to Pier 21 in Halifax, Nova Scotia making 86 calls at Halifax. In 1968, Olympia was registered in Greece, and spent an increasing number of voyages cruising, this becoming her exclusive occupation in 1970. By this time she had been re-measured at 17,400 GRT. She was laid up at Piraeus in 1974, and the Greek Line suffered financial collapse the following year.

In 1981, Olympia was bought by Sally Shipping with the plan was to use the ship as both a floating hotel and for occasional Caribbean cruises. She was renamed Caribe and refitted with Klockner-Humboldt-Deutz diesels of 20,270 shp (15,120 kW) replacing the steam turbines. The diesel engines reduced her service speed to approximately 18 knots (33 km/h; 21 mph). In addition to the new power plant, extensive interior modifications were carried out. These modifications included but were not confined to: Removal of the Agean pool and converting that space into the Mermaid Bar, conversion of the Calypso Room, Card Room and Drawing Room into suites. The Derby Room and Taverna, aft of the Olympian Hall restaurant on restaurant deck was converted into a casino. One public room that remained untouched throughout her life was her paneled library on Promenade deck. When the hotel plan was cancelled she returned to cruising and was renamed Caribe I in 1983, in the Commodore Cruise Line fleet. The ship's original funnel had been replaced by exhaust pipes decorated in a framework design. In 1988, this was replaced by a more traditional funnel. In 1993 she was sold to Regal Cruises and renamed Regal Empress, and began sailing out of Port Manatee in the Northern Hemisphere winters and New York City during the summers. She was then described as being only 14,500 GRT.

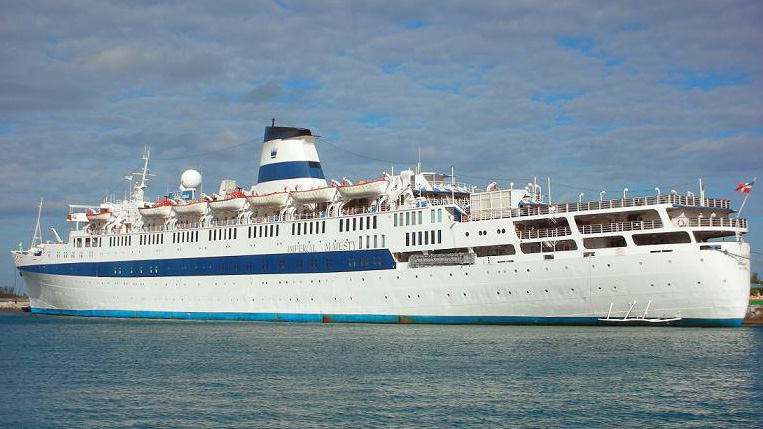
Regal Empress in 2006.

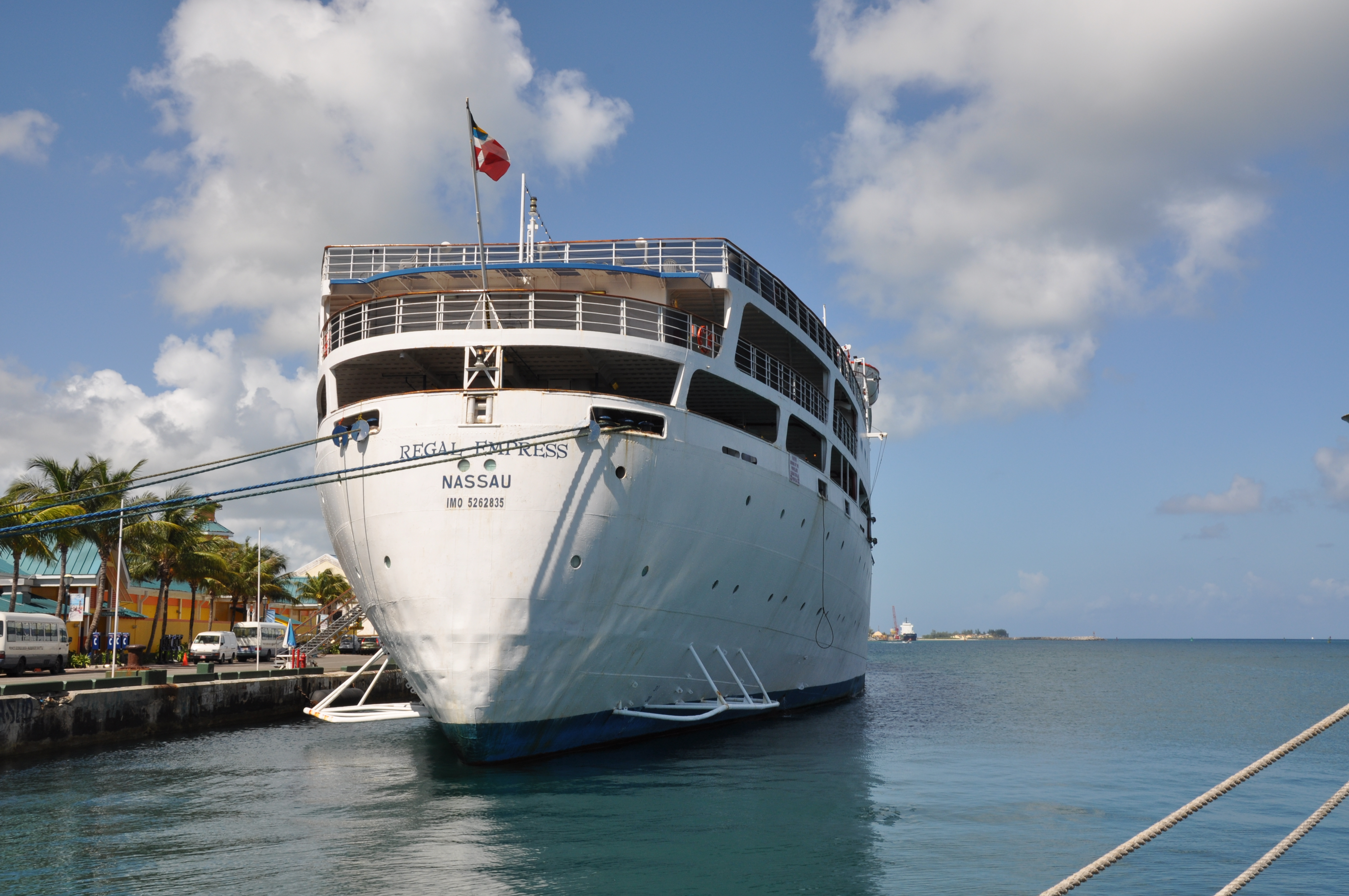
Regal Empress at Nassau on 22 September 2008.

Following the collapse of Regal Cruises, Regal Empress was purchased by Imperial Majesty Cruise Line for their two-night cruise service to The Bahamas, Regal Empress being cheaper to operate and carrying more passengers than their own ship OceanBreeze. Regal Empress was featured in a late-2007 episode of the TV show MythBusters, where she was used to demonstrate that it is possible to waterski from the back of a cruise ship. In September 2008, Regal Empress was removed from service to be used as an aid in the recovery of the aftermath of Hurricane Ike. She was laid up in Texas for about two months. She returned to service in December 2008.

Her last voyage took place on 6 March 2009. On 9 March 2009 Regal Empress was retired by Imperial Majesty Cruise Line. She was laid up for sale and inspection in Freeport, Bahamas until late March. It was reported by Maritime Matters on 26 March that Regal Empress was sold for scrap. Regal Empress was replaced by a newer ship, Bahamas Celebration. The new ship carried on the same cruise itineraries as Regal Empress did. Bahamas Celebration operated for a new cruise line, Celebration Cruise Line, until the company ceased operations in early 2015 following the ship's accidental grounding in 2014. Celebration Cruise Line was owned by the same company that had operated Regal Empress.

Regal Empress departed Freeport in early April to sail to her final destination in Alang. Her voyage took over three months to complete. She was beached on 24 July 2009. In October, scrapping began starting from the bow of the ship. The demolition of the ship was completed in early 2010.
