= Shaw, Savill & Albion Line =

Shipping line Britain to Australasia

- House flag
- Industry: Shipping
- Founded: 1882
- Defunct: 1975
- Fate: Defunct
- Successor: Furness, Withy Co. Ltd.
- Headquarters: London, United Kingdom

Shaw, Savill & Albion Line was the shipping line of P Henderson & Company, a British shipping management that operated trans-British, Australian and New Zealand cargo and passenger routes when P Henderson's Albion Line merged with Shaw Savill Line in 1882, lasting till 1970 when Elder Dempster Lines chartered P Henderson fleets in 1947 till 1965 when Ocean Group plc acquired Elder, Dempster, till the Suez Crisis when the last 3 Henderson ships were transferred to Elder, Dempster and the Henderson label phased out.

== History ==
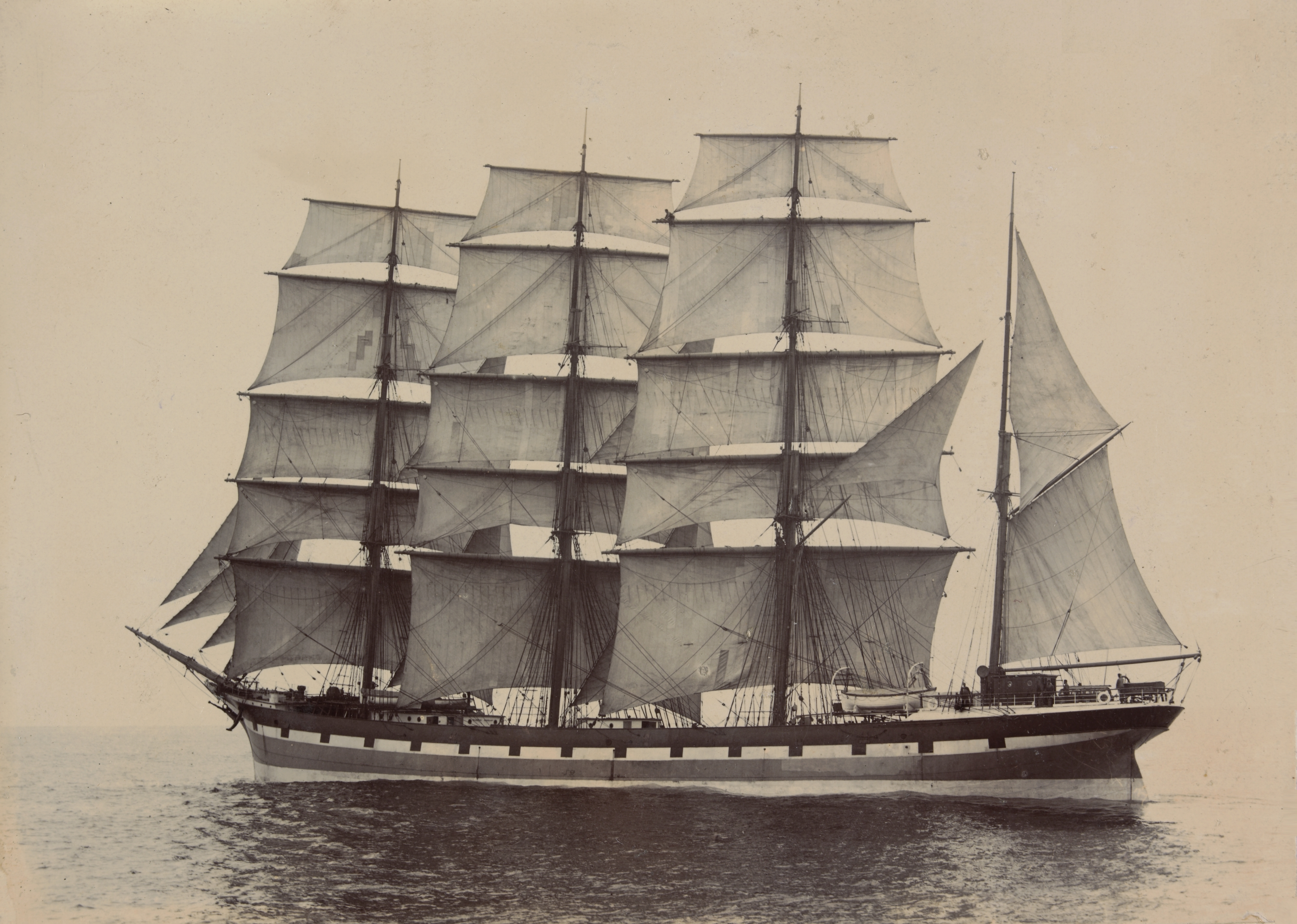
Lindfield was a four-masted barque built in 1891. Shaw, Savill and Albion sold her to Norwegian buyers in 1911.

The company was created in 1882 by the amalgamation of Shaw, Savill & Company Ltd. and Albion Shipping Co. Ltd. The new company comprised 12 ships from the Albion line and 19 from Shaw Savill. This number included the Euterpe (later renamed Star of India) – the oldest ship still regularly sailing.

At the annual shareholders' meeting of the company on 12 April 1892, profits for the year of £35,270 16s 2d were announced.

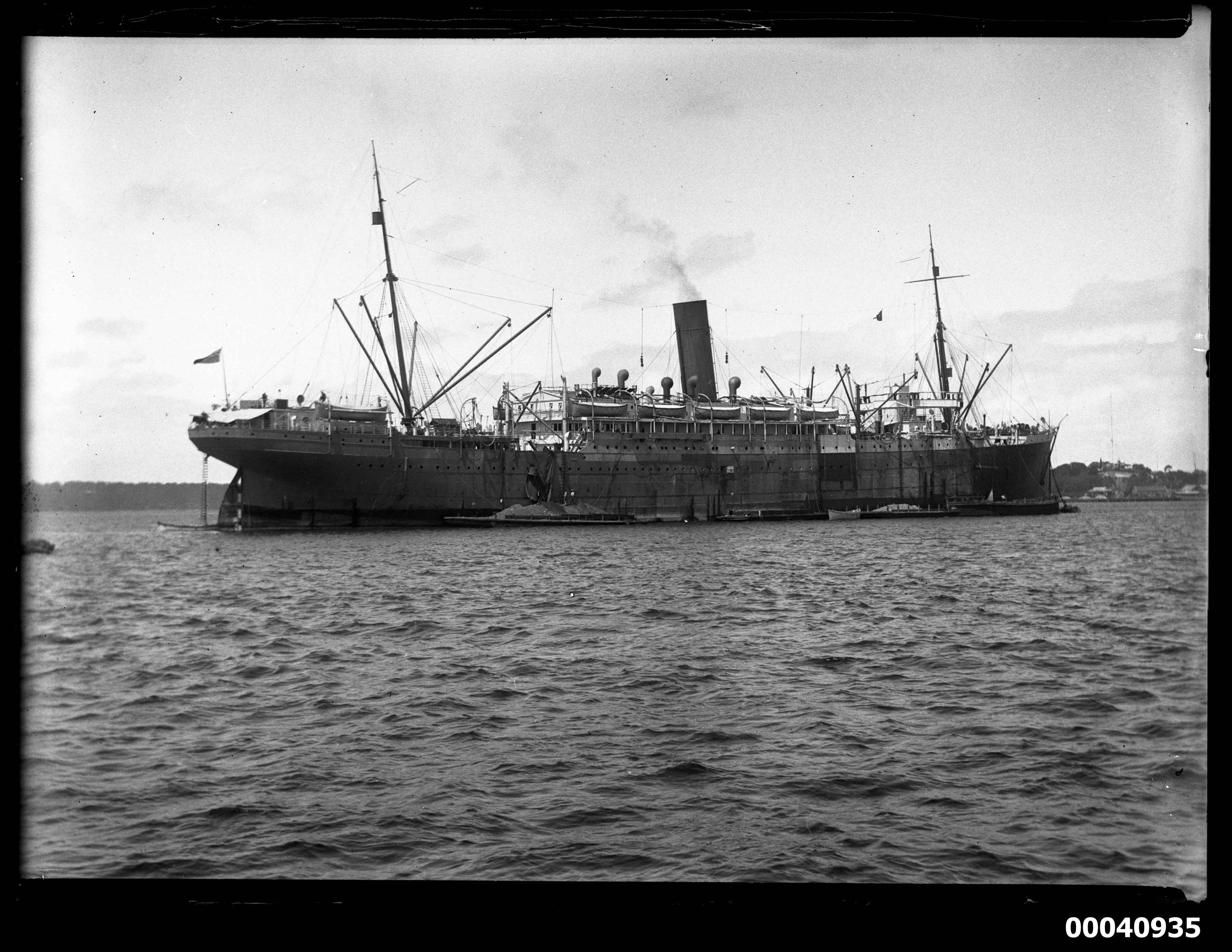
Aberdeen Line's Themistocles, built in 1911, came to Shaw, Savill and Albion in 1932.

In 1928 White Star Line bought 18 Shaw, Savill and Albion ships. In 1932 Shaw, Savill and Albion took over Aberdeen Line, and in 1933 Furness, Withy Co., Ltd. acquired control of Shaw, Savill and Albion. In 1934 White Star merged with Cunard Line and gave up its routes to Australia and New Zealand, selling assets including the liners Ionic and Ceramic to Shaw, Savill and Albion.

Shaw, Savill and Albion ran refrigerated cargo liners between New Zealand and the UK via the Panama Canal. In the 1930s Harland and Wolff built for Shaw, Savill four 13,000 DWT refrigerated cargo motor ships: Waiwera and Waipawa launched in 1934, Wairangi launched in 1935 and Waimarama launched in 1938. As well as being unusually large for their era, the "W-class" were among the swiftest cargo ships in the World. On sea trials Waimarama achieved 20 knots (37 km/h).

In 1936, Shaw, Savill and Albion announced plans to sell Ionic. She was scrapped in 1936 or 1937 in Osaka, Japan. In 1939 the company introduced a new flagship, the 27,155 GRT QSMV Dominion Monarch. Her unique initials stood for "Quadruple Screw Motor Vessel".

In the Second World War Dominion Monarch was a highly successful troop ship. A U-boat sank Waiwera in June 1942. The "W-class" refrigerated ships' unusually high speed led to both Wairangi and Waimarama being selected for Operation Pedestal to relieve Malta. Both were sunk by enemy action on 13 August 1942, the day before the convoy reached its destination. Waipawa was the only member of the "W-class" to survive the war.

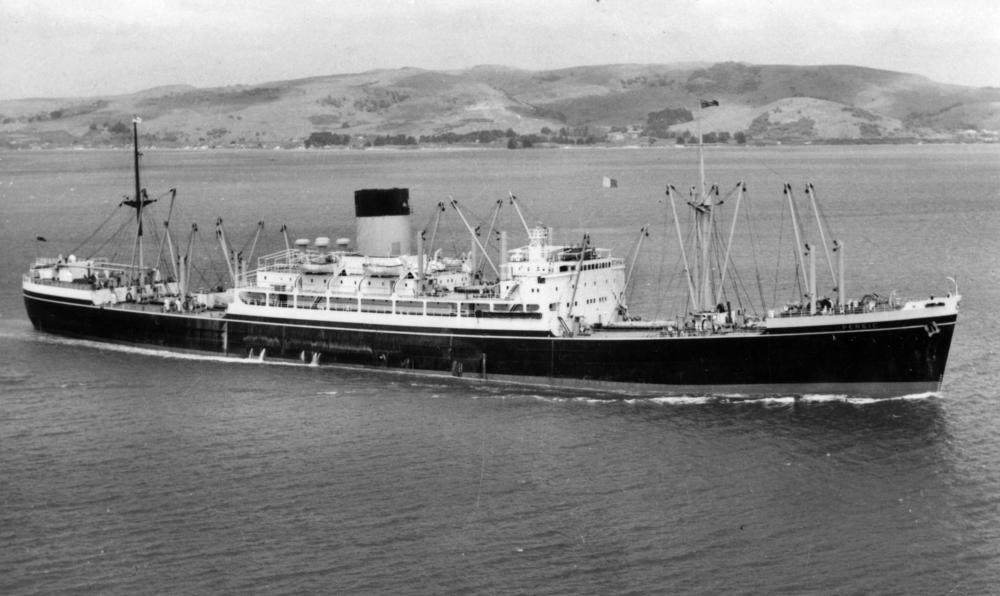
Cammell Laird completed the cargo ship Persic for Shaw, Savill and Albion in 1949.

In 1955 Dominion Monarch was joined by a new flagship, the 20,204 GRT Southern Cross. The 24,731 GRT Northern Star replaced Dominion Monarch in 1962. As the scheduled liner trade declined, the company laid up Southern Cross in 1972, initially in the Port of Southampton, and after 6 months she sailed to the River Fal for further lay up until being sold to Greek interests in 1973; after a major transformation she reappeared as Calypso.

Another notable vessel was the Gothic, which had the honour of serving as a royal yacht in 1954.

With the company losing money and the oil crisis of 1973 having a major effect on the company a decision was made to withdraw Northern Star and Ocean Monarch from service in 1975, with both ships being sold to Taiwanese breakers. Northern Star was only 13 years old when she was scrapped. With a long history of mechanical problems there was no potential purchaser of her.

A variation of the flag used by the United Tribes of New Zealand was used by the Shaw, Savill & Albion Line as its company flag.
