= USS Phoenix (CL-46) =

1938 Brooklyn-class light cruiser of the US Navy

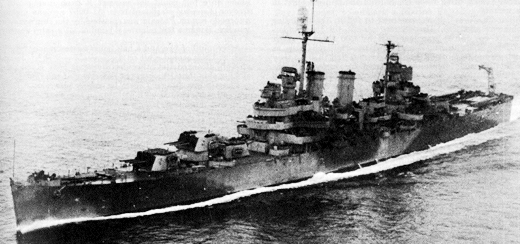
- USS Phoenix (1944)

History

United States
- Name: Phoenix
- Namesake: City of Phoenix, Arizona
- Ordered: 13 February 1929
- Awarded: 22 August 1934
- Builder: New York Shipbuilding Corporation, Camden, New Jersey
- Cost: $11,975,000 (contract price)
- Laid down: 15 April 1935
- Launched: 12 March 1938
- Sponsored by: Mrs. Dorothea Kays Moonan
- Commissioned: 3 October 1938
- Decommissioned: 3 July 1946
- Stricken: 27 January 1951
- Identification: Hull symbol:CL-46; Code letters:NAJJ
- Honors and awards: 11 × battle stars
- Fate: Sold to Argentina, 9 April 1951, as ARA 17 de Octubre

History

Argentina
- Name: 17 de Octubre
- Namesake: 17 October 1945, the day popular demonstrations forced the release of Juan Perón
- Acquired: 9 April 1951
- Renamed: ARA General Belgrano (C-4)
- Namesake: Manuel Belgrano
- Fate: Torpedoed and sunk by HMS Conqueror on 2 May 1982, during the Falklands War

General characteristics (as built)
- Class & type: Brooklyn-class cruiser
- Displacement: 10,000 long tons (10,160 t) (estimated as design); 9,767 long tons (9,924 t) (standard); 12,207 long tons (12,403 t) (max)
- Length: 600 ft (180 m) oa; 608 ft 4 in (185.42 m) lwl
- Beam: 61 ft 7 in (18.77 m)
- Draft: 19 ft 9 in (6.02 m) (mean); 24 ft (7.3 m) (max)
- Installed power: 8 × Steam boilers; 100,000 shp (75,000 kW)
- Propulsion: 4 × geared turbines; 4 × screws
- Speed: 32.5 kn (37.4 mph; 60.2 km/h)
- Complement: 868 officers and enlisted
- Armament: 15 × 6 in (150 mm)/47 caliber guns (5x3); 8 × 5 in (130 mm)/25 caliber anti-aircraft guns (8×1); 8 × caliber 0.50 in (13 mm) machine guns
- Armor: Belt: 3 1/4–5 in (83–127 mm); Deck: 2 in (51 mm); Barbettes: 6 in (150 mm); Turrets: 1 1/4–6 in (32–152 mm); Conning tower: 2 1/4–5 in (57–127 mm)
- Aircraft carried: 4 × SOC Seagull floatplanes
- Aviation facilities: 2 × stern catapults

General characteristics (1945)
- Armament: 15 × 6 in (150 mm)/47 caliber guns (5x3); 8 × 5 in (130 mm)/25 caliber anti-aircraft guns (8×1); 4 × quad 40 mm (1.6 in) Bofors anti-aircraft guns; 2 × twin 40 mm (1.6 in) Bofors anti-aircraft guns; 18 × single 20 mm (0.79 in) Oerlikon anti-aircraft cannons

USS Phoenix (CL-46) was a light cruiser of the Brooklyn class. She was the third Phoenix of the United States Navy. After World War II the ship was transferred to Argentina in 1951 and was named General Belgrano in 1956. General Belgrano was sunk during the Falklands War in 1982 by the British submarine HMS Conqueror.

She was laid down on 15 April 1935 by the New York Shipbuilding Corporation, Camden, New Jersey; launched on 13 March 1938; sponsored by Mrs. Dorothea Kays Moonan; and commissioned at Philadelphia Navy Yard on 3 October 1938. Her name was in honor of the capital city of the state of Arizona.

== Service history ==
The Phoenix's initial shakedown cruise for purposes of performance testing took her to Port of Spain, Trinidad. She continued to Santos, Brazil, then to Buenos Aires, Argentina, to Montevideo, Uruguay, and finally to San Juan, Puerto Rico. The new cruiser returned to Philadelphia in January 1939. In March 1939 she transited the Panama Canal for a new home port of San Pedro, California. From June 1939 until April 1940, she toured the west coast with ports of call in Santa Cruz, San Francisco, California, Portland, Oregon, and points in between. During March 1940 she was en route to Lahaina Roads, Maui and then on to a new home port of Pearl Harbor, Hawaii.

=== World War II ===
==== Pearl Harbor and convoy operations ====
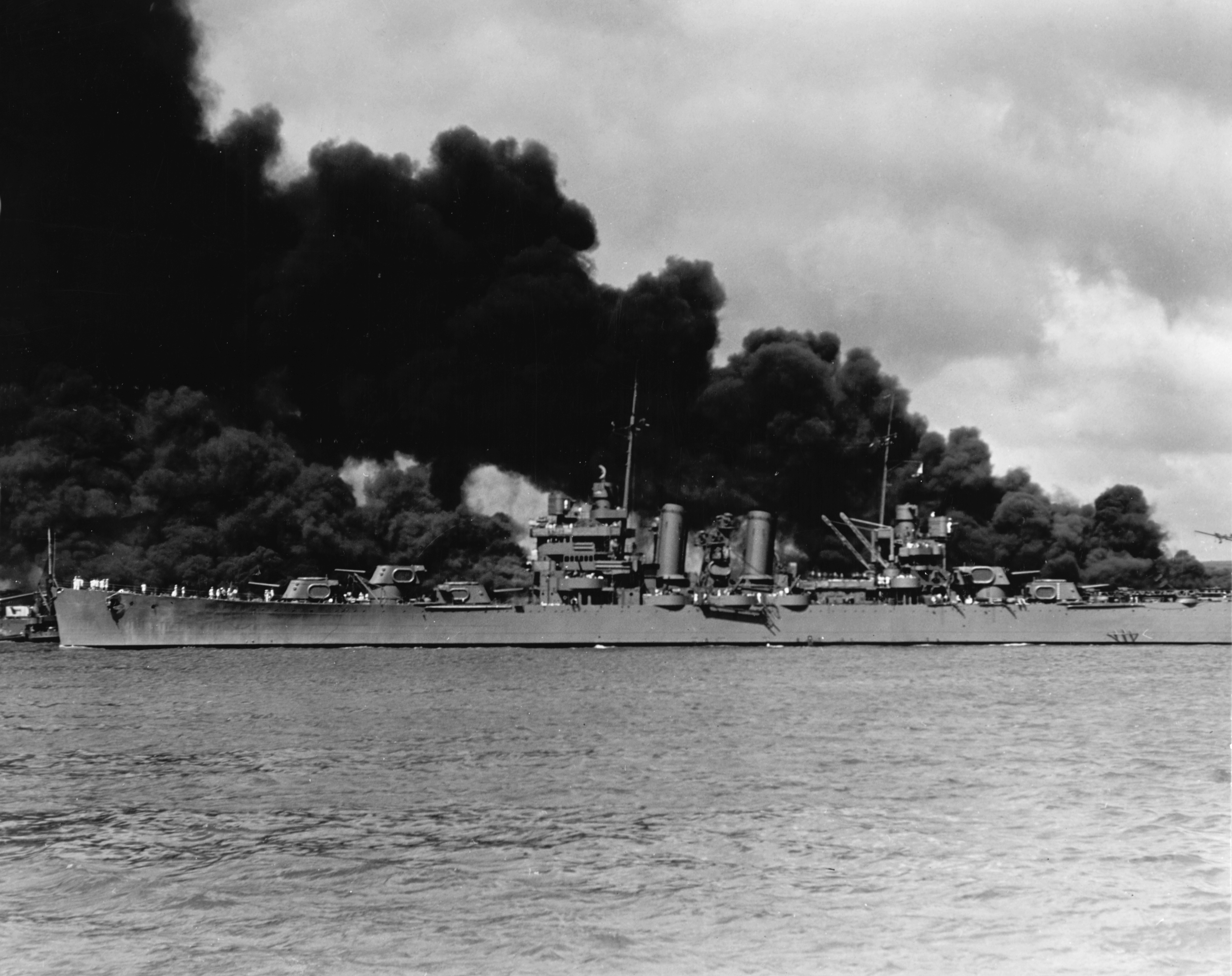
Phoenix passing the battleships West Virginia and Arizona at Pearl Harbor in 1941.

The Phoenix then operated off the West Coast and was later based at Pearl Harbor. On 7 December 1941 during the attack on Pearl Harbor she was anchored north east of Ford Island near Solace. Observers on board the Phoenix sighted the rising sun of Japan on planes coming in low over Ford Island and a few seconds later the ship's guns took them under fire. The Phoenix escaped the disaster unharmed and shortly after noon was underway to join the cruisers St. Louis and Detroit and several destroyers in an impromptu task force searching, unsuccessfully, for the enemy aircraft carriers.

The Phoenix next escorted the first convoy to the United States from Pearl Harbor after the attack and returned at once with another convoy.

On 12 January 1942 the Phoenix, along with two destroyers, departed San Francisco escorting the "Australian — Suva" convoy composed of the troopships SS Mariposa, SS President Coolidge for Melbourne and President Monroe (destined for Suva) in the first large convoy to Australia after Pearl Harbor. Of particular significance, this convoy carried troops, fifty crated P-40 fighter aircraft intended for the Philippines and Java, munitions, supplies, and officers selected by the War Department to form the core of what was to become MacArthur's headquarters in the Southwest Pacific Area Command. The Command was formed in Australia as United States Army Forces in Australia (USAFIA) and known as the "Remember Pearl Harbor" Group. For some time the cruiser operated in Australian waters escorting troop ships, and once steamed as far north as Java.

The Phoenix escorted the United States Army Transport Willard A. Holbrook and the Australian transports Duntroon and Katoomba, which had been substituted for the withdrawn Mariposa, as convoy MS.5 leaving Melbourne 12 February for Fremantle and ultimately bound for Colombo, Ceylon with troops and supplies destined for India. At Fremantle the aircraft carrier Langley and merchant vessel Sea Witch joined the convoy with a 22 February departure for Colombo. Of particular note in the cargo of the convoy and specifically that of Langley and Sea Witch were P-40 aircraft, originally intended for the Philippines, that had been delivered to Australia earlier by Mariposa and President Coolidge in the convoy escorted by Phoenix from San Francisco. The plan had been that on relief of Phoenix by a British cruiser in the vicinity of Cocos Island she would escort Langley and Sea Witch to Java. Instead Langley and Sea Witch were destined to break with the convoy for Tjilatjap, Java under orders from Admiral Helfrich received the day after departure from Fremantle and proceed independently to deliver their aircraft. Langley was attacked and sunk on 27 February. Sea Witch successfully made delivery on 28 February just as the results of the Battle of the Java Sea had sealed the fate of the islands. The crated planes delivered were destroyed before assembly to deny them to the enemy. Phoenix turned over escort of the Colombo bound ships about 300 miles west of Cocos Island to HMS Enterprise on 28 February and returned to Fremantle on 5 March 1942.

During the following months, the Phoenix patrolled in the Indian Ocean, escorted a convoy to Bombay, and was present at the evacuation of Java.

Under the command of Captain Joseph R. Redman, the Phoenix was a part of Task Force 44 in late 1942. With her accompanying destroyers Helm, Mugford and Patterson, she participated in Operation Lilliput, alternating with the Australian light cruiser HMAS Hobart and her accompanying destroyers to cover the convoys south of New Guinea.

The Phoenix departed Brisbane, Queensland, Australia, for overhaul in the Philadelphia Navy Yard in July 1943 before carrying Secretary of State Cordell Hull to Casablanca. She was then assigned to the 7th Fleet and sailed for the South Pacific.

==== South Pacific operations ====
On 26 December, in company with the cruiser Nashville, she bombarded the Cape Gloucester area of New Britain, smashing shore installations in a four-hour shelling. Phoenix covered landing forces as they went ashore and furnished support fire against enemy strong points which had not been demolished. On the night of 25–26 January 1944, the ship took part in a night raid on Madang and Alexishafen, New Guinea, shelling shore installations.

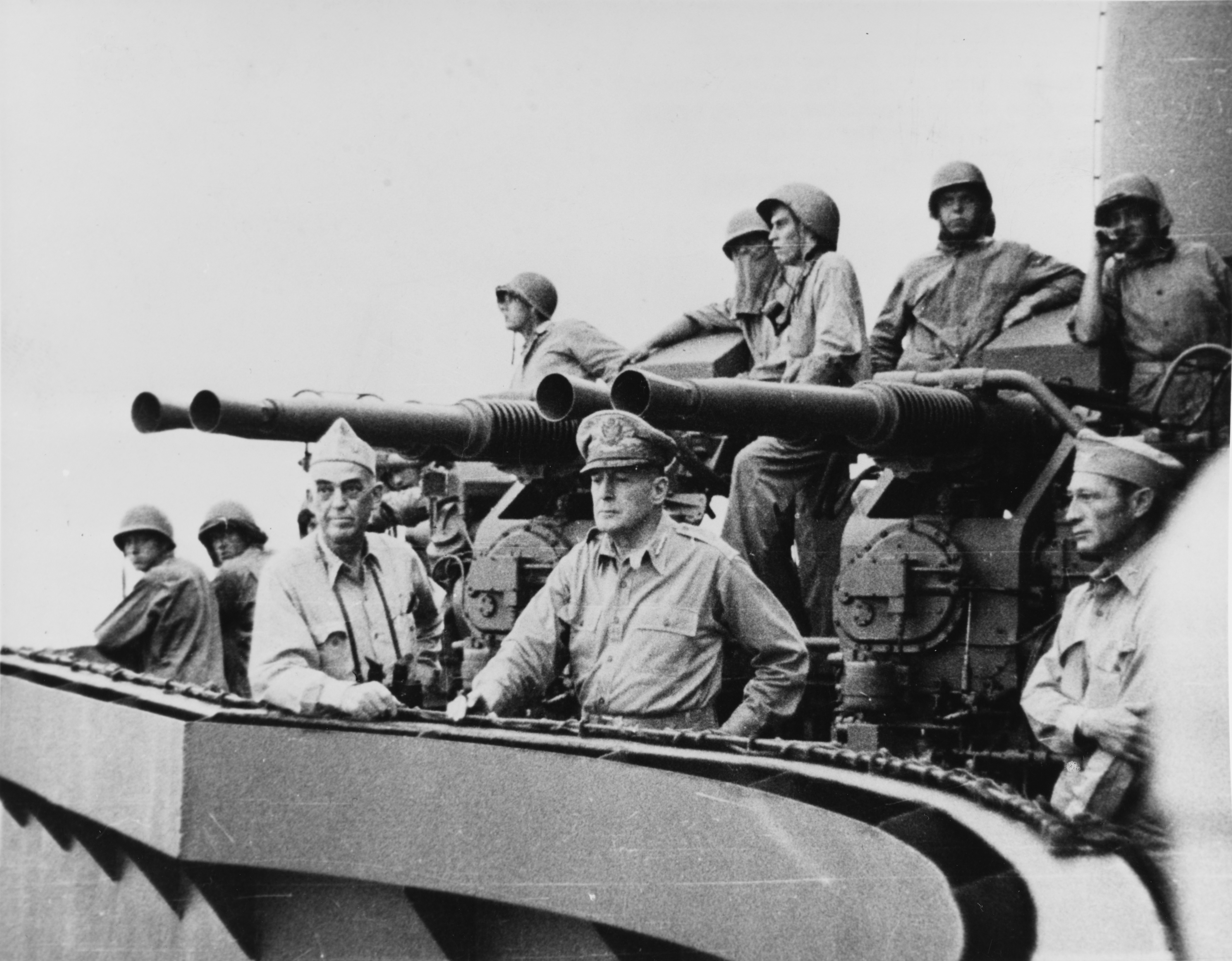
Vice Admiral Thomas C. Kinkaid (left center) with General Douglas MacArthur (center) on the flag bridge of Phoenix during the pre-invasion bombardment of Los Negros Island.

Phoenix then moved to the Admiralty Islands to support the 1st Cavalry Division in a reconnaissance-in-force on Los Negros Island on 29 February. When the troops went ashore after the prelanding bombardment, enemy resistance was so weak that a withdrawal was not necessary and the island was occupied. General Douglas MacArthur was on board during the course of the operations.

On 4 and 7 March, Phoenix, Nashville, and HMAS Shropshire bombarded Hauwei Island (just west of Los Negros Island) of the Admiralty Group. Enemy guns on this island had threatened Allied positions in the Admiralties, particularly on Manus Island; and, although return fire from the beach was heavy, enemy batteries ceased firing when shells from the cruisers burst in their vicinity.

In the Battle of Hollandia, the start of the Western New Guinea campaign, Hollandia was next to fall to the mounting amphibious offensive. This largest assault 'til then undertaken by American forces, was launched by 200 ships. Phoenix shelled the shore in the Humboldt Bay-Hollandia area as the troops went ashore on 22 April, and supported them as they consolidated their gains and prepared for further attacks along the northwest coast of the big island. Phoenix shelled the Wakde and Sawar Airfields on the night of 29–30 April to neutralize the danger of air attack on newly won Allied positions on New Guinea.

General Douglas MacArthur's troops next landed at Arare on 17 May to secure airfields to support further operations in the Netherlands New Guinea area. This beachhead was later extended to include Wakde Island by a shore to shore movement of troops. Phoenix bombarded the Toem area and escorted the troops to the landing beach.

The amphibious Battle of Biak followed. There, MacArthur planned to establish a forward base for heavy bombers. With Nashville and Boise, Phoenix sortied from Humboldt Bay on 25 May and two days later supported the landing. While the task force fired on shore installations, two of the escorting destroyers were hit by shells from shore batteries. Phoenix wiped out the gun emplacement with two salvos from her 5 in (130 mm)/25 cal batteries.

On 4 June, off the northwest coast of New Guinea, eight Japanese fighter bombers attacked Phoenix's task force. Two confined their attention to Phoenix. Although the ship's gunfire did not hit the planes, it diverted their bomb runs. Both planes dropped bombs, one of which burst in the water close to Phoenix, killing one man and wounding four others with fragments. The ship also suffered some underwater leakage and damage to her propellers. The following night, aircraft again attacked Phoenix. This time, low-flying torpedo bombers struck as she proceeded through Yapen Strait, between Biak and Yapen islands, but her gunfire and evasive tactics prevented damage.

Phoenix and her task force frustrated an enemy attempt to reinforce their garrisons on the night of 8–9 June. When they contacted the American ships, the Japanese destroyers turned and fled at such high speed that only one US destroyer division was able to get within firing range. After a running fight of three hours at long range, Phoenix assisted in damaging the destroyer Shigure, which was hit by two 6-inch (152 mm) shells that disabled her forward turret, but was unable to accomplish much else as she and her sisters broke off action.

With Boise and ten destroyers, Phoenix sortied from Seeadler Harbor in the Admiralties and bombarded shore defenses before American forces landed on Noemfoor Island on 2 July. After the battle, many dead Japanese and wrecked planes were found in the target area assigned to Phoenix.

Boise, Nashville, Shropshire, Phoenix and HMAS Australia joined for the occupation of Morotai in the Molucca Islands on 15 September. The cruisers shelled nearby Halmahera Island to cover the landing and protect the assault forces as they went ashore against continuing light opposition.

==== Philippines campaign ====
The long-awaited re-conquest of the Philippines began with the landing on Leyte. Phoenix, attached to the Close Covering Group, heavily bombarded the beaches before the highly successful landing on 20 October. Her batteries silenced an enemy strong point holding up the advance of a battalion of the 19th Infantry Regiment and continued to furnish effective callfire.

In the Battle of Leyte Gulf, Phoenix was a unit of Rear Admiral Jesse Oldendorf's group which neutralised and repelled the Japanese Southern Force in the battle of Surigao Strait. Phoenix fired four spotting salvoes, and when the fourth hit, opened up with all of her 6-inch (152 mm) batteries. The target later proved to be Yamashiro, which sank after 27 minutes of concentrated fire from the American fleet. The Japanese also lost Fusō and three destroyers in the battle, and American planes sank Mogami the next day.

Phoenix then patrolled the mouth of Leyte Gulf to protect Allied positions on shore. On the morning of 1 November 1944, ten enemy torpedo-bombers attacked her and accompanying ships. At 0945, Phoenix opened fire and five minutes later, Claxton was hit by a kamikaze. Almost at the same instant, hits from Phoenix's 5 in (130 mm) guns set another plane afire but could not prevent it from diving into the starboard bow of Ammen. At 0957, a plane making a torpedo run on Phoenix was shot down by the ship's machine-gun fire, but in a few minutes a bomber hit Killen.

After a lull of two and a half hours, more kamikazes arrived and, at 1340, scored a hit on the destroyer Abner Read. Japanese aircraft attacked the other destroyers as they stood by the sinking ship, but Phoenix shot down one of the raiders.

Phoenix was attacked again by enemy planes on 5 December and was credited with assisting in the destruction of two attackers. Five days later, a kamikaze attempted to crash into the ship but was brought down by 40 mm fire when only 100 yd (100 m) away. It was at this time Phoenix suffered her only wartime fatality.

While proceeding to the assault area off Mindoro on 13 December, the ship was constantly under air attack by single kamikazes. That day, a lone kamikaze hit Nashville. On 15 December, a 5-inch (127 mm) shell from Phoenix brought down a circling plane at 8,500 yards (7.8 km). The ship then furnished her usual fire support and covered the landing forces. This gave the Allies a base from which to strike at Japan's shipping lanes through the South China Sea and to soften up Luzon for forthcoming landings.

En route to Lingayen Gulf for the invasion of Luzon, lookouts on board Phoenix sighted the conning tower of a diving submarine in the Mindanao Sea off Siquijor. The submarine submerged and fired two torpedoes which Phoenix dodged. Taylor blew the midget sub to the surface and rammed her.

==== End of the war ====
Phoenix covered minesweeping operations at Balikpapan, Borneo, from 29 June to 7 July. Resistance from coastal guns was unusually heavy. Mines and shellfire sank or damaged 11 minesweepers. Phoenix furnished supporting fire and the assault waves landed. Next came Bataan and Corregidor, taken from 13 to 28 February 1945.

Phoenix was en route to Pearl Harbor for overhaul when Japan capitulated. She headed home and, upon reaching the Panama Canal on 6 September, joined the Atlantic Fleet. Her status was reduced to in commission, in reserve, at Philadelphia on 28 February 1946.

Phoenix was decommissioned on 3 July 1946. She remained at Philadelphia until sold to Argentina on 9 April 1951.

Her ship's bell is among the collection of the Naval History and Heritage Command's Curator Branch.

== Argentine service ==
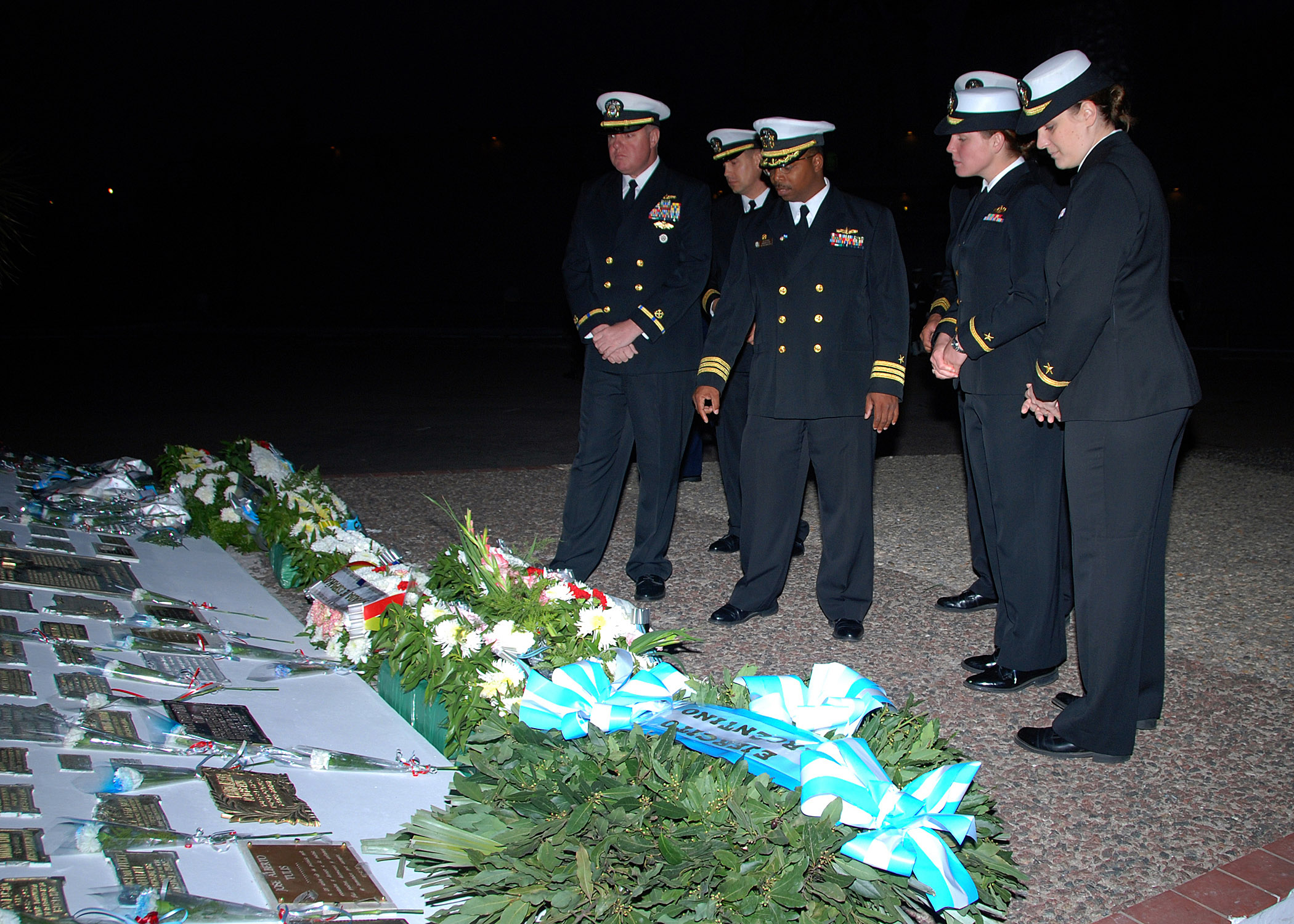
USS Pearl Harbor Commanding Officer and fellow officers pay homage to a memorial dedicated to the Argentinean ship ARA General Belgrano during a 25th anniversary remembrance service

Having been purchased by Argentina on 9 April 1951, she was commissioned in the Argentine Navy as ARA Diecisiete de Octubre (C-4) on 17 October 1951. In 1956 she was renamed ARA General Belgrano, then upgraded in 1967–68 with new Dutch radars and British Sea Cat anti-aircraft missiles. General Belgrano was sunk during the Falklands War in 1982 with the loss of 323 lives by the British nuclear-powered submarine HMS Conqueror, becoming the first ship sunk in combat by a nuclear-powered submarine.

== Awards ==
- American Defense Service Medal with "FLEET" clasp
- Asiatic-Pacific Campaign Medal with eleven battle stars
- World War II Victory Medal
- Philippine Presidential Unit Citation
- Philippine Liberation Medal with two stars

== Bibliography ==
- Craven, Wesley Frank; Cate, James Lea (1948). Plans and early operations, January 1939 to August 1942. The Army Air Forces In World War II. Vol. One. Washington, DC: Office of Air Force History. ISBN 091279903X. LCCN 83017288.
- Gill, G Hermon (1957). Royal Australian Navy 1939–1942. Australia in the War of 1939–1945. Series 2 – Navy. Vol. 1. Canberra: Australian War Memorial. LCCN 58037940. Archived from the original on 25 May 2009.
- Naval History And Heritage Command. "Phoenix". Dictionary of American Naval Fighting Ships. Naval History And Heritage Command. Archived from the original on 31 March 2004.
- Matloff, Maurice; Snell, Edwin M (1953–59). The War Department: Strategic Planning For Coalition Warfare 1941–1942. United States Army In World War II. Washington, DC: Center Of Military History, United States Army. LCCN 53-61477.
- Mayo, Lida (1968). The Ordnance Department: On Beachhead and Battlefront. Center of Military History, United States Army. Archived from the original on 6 November 2011.
- Morison, Samuel Eliot (1947–62). "XIX". The Rising Sun in the Pacific. History of United States naval operations in World War II. Vol. 3. Little, Brown. LCCN 47001571.
- Fahey, James C (1941). The Ships and Aircraft of the US Fleet, Two-Ocean Fleet Edition. Ships and Aircraft.
- Nimitz, Chester W., Admiral (USN); Steele, James M, Captain (USN) (1942). 'Gray Book' — War Plans and Files of the Commander-in-Chief, Pacific Fleet; Running Estimate and Summary maintained by Captain James M. Steele, USN, CINCPAC staff at Pearl Harbor, Hawaii, covering the period 7 December 1941–31 August 1942 (PDF). Vol. 1 of 8 volumes. Washington DC: Operational Archives, Naval History and Heritage Command, Washington Navy Yard.
- Wright, Christopher C (September 2019). "Question 7/56: Concerning What Radar Systems Were Installed on U.S. Asiatic Fleet Ships in December 1941". Warship International. LVI (3): 192–198. ISSN 0043-0374.
