= SS Tuscania (1921) =

Passenger ship

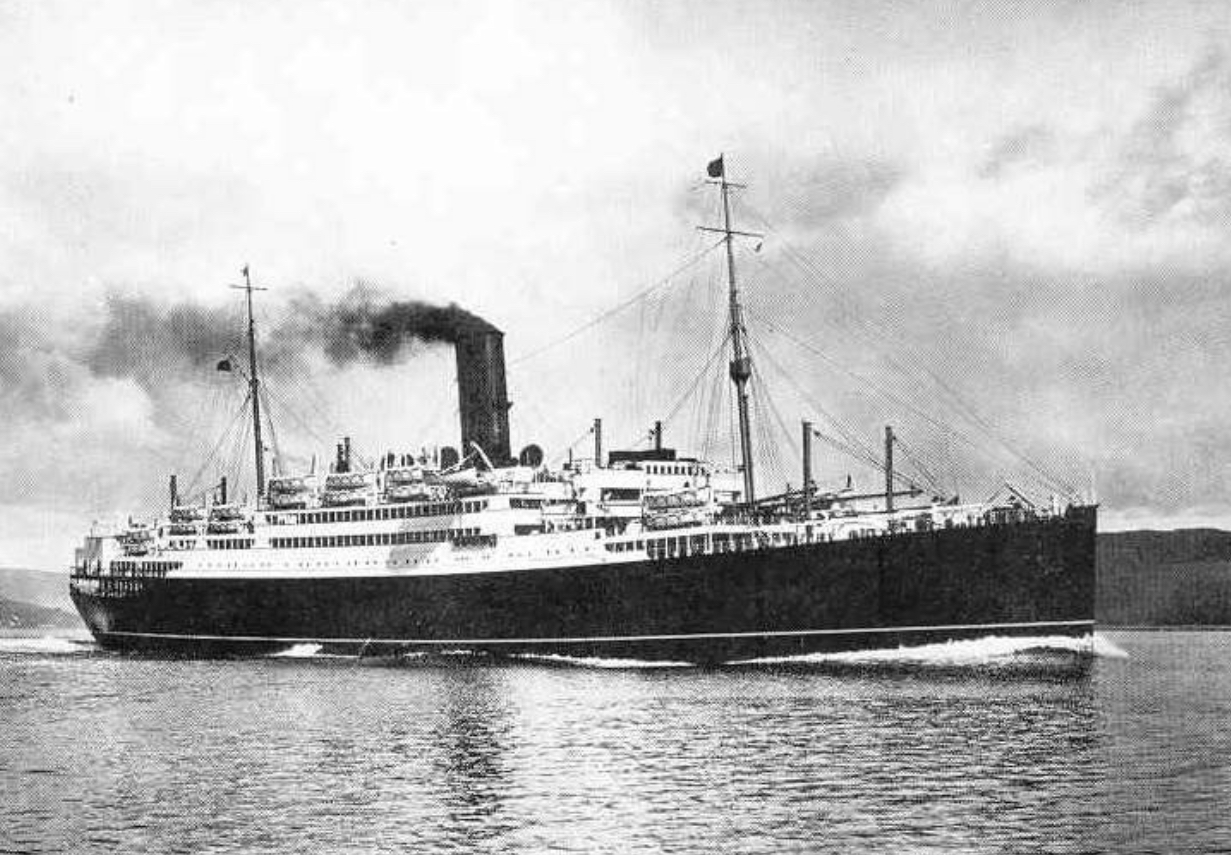
- Tuscania (2) under way

History

United Kingdom
- Name: Tuscania (1922–1939); Nea Hellas (1941–1947)
- Namesake: Tuscania
- Owner: Anchor Line (1922–1939); British Government (1941–1947)
- Operator: Anchor Line (1922–1939, 1941–1947); Cunard Line (1926–1931, summer only)
- Port of registry: Glasgow (1922–1939, 1941–1947)
- Route: Glasgow–New York (1922–1939); Troopship (1941–1947)
- Builder: Fairfield Shipbuilding and Engineering Company, Govan, Glasgow
- Yard number: 595
- Launched: 4 October 1921
- Maiden voyage: 16 September 1922

Greece
- Name: Nea Hellas (1939–1955); New York (1955–1961)
- Owner: General Steam Navigation Company of Greece (1939–1941, 1947–1961)
- Port of registry: Andros (1939–1941, 1947–1961)
- Route: Piraeus–New York (1939–1955); Bremen–New York (1955–1959)
- Fate: Broken up at Onomichi, Hiroshima in 1961

General characteristics
- Type: Ocean liner
- Tonnage: 16,991 GRT
- Length: 575 feet (175 m)
- Beam: 70 feet (21 m)
- Installed power: Steam turbines
- Propulsion: Twin propellers
- Speed: 16 knots
- Capacity: 1,400 passengers
- Crew: 200

SS Tuscania was built by Fairfield Shipbuilding and Engineering Company, and launched on 4 October 1921 for the Anchor Line.

== Building and description ==
During the First World War, several large liners of Glasgow-based Anchor Line (Henderson Bros) Ltd were lost, including the earlier Tuscania of 1914. Embarking on a replacement programme even before the end of 1918, the replacement Tuscania for the Mediterranean-New York service was built by Fairfield Shipbuilding and Engineering Company at Govan, Glasgow, as yard number 595. She measured 16,991 gross register tons (GRT) and 10,016 net register tons (NRT), was 552.3 ft (168.3 m) long between perpendiculars by 70.3 ft (21.4 m) beam and had a depth of 38.6 ft (11.8 m). She had six Brown-Curtis steam turbines, also made by Fairfield, driving twin screws via double reduction gearing, giving her a speed of 15.5 knots (28.7 km/h; 17.8 mph).

The ship was formally named Tuscania when launched on 4 October 1921, in the midst of the post-war economic slump, when many shipowners, Anchor Line included, had asked builders to slow or suspend building work. Tuscania was not completed until almost a year later; she ran sea trials on 8 September 1922 and was registered at Glasgow with Official Number 146307. As completed, she has capacity for 2,462 passengers (267 1st class, 377 2nd and 1818 3rd) and a complement of 342 officers and crew.

== History ==
=== Anchor Line ===
Earlier plans to deploy Tuscania on the company's Mediterranean-New York service were changed, and she began her career on the Glasgow-Moville-New York route, leaving the Clyde on her maiden voyage on 16 September 1922. She continued on the North Atlantic, with occasional New York-Mediterranean voyages, until May 1926.

In May 1926, Tuscania was chartered to the Cunard Line for its service between London and New York, via Southampton and Le Havre, and repainted in the charterer's colours. She was returned for service with Anchor Line in 1931. She was later employed on their Liverpool-India service and cruising until sold in 1939 to the Goulandris brothers' General Steam Navigation Company of Greecealso known as Greek Line.

=== Nea Hellas ===
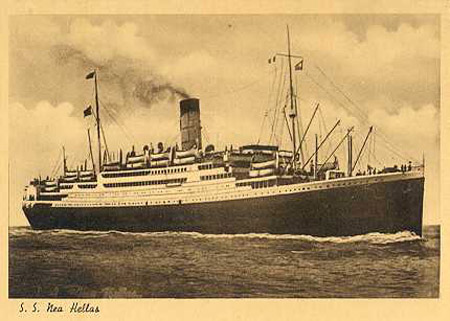
SS Nea Hellas

Upon arrival in Piraeus on 8 March 1939 the ship was renamed Nea Hellas (Νέα Έλλας, meaning "New Greece") and refitted for service between Piraeus and New York City beginning on 19 May 1939. Nea Hellas was fittited with 200 1st class cabins 400-tourists, and 500-3rd class passengers. Service between these two ports was interrupted for the duration of World War II for use as a troopship for Allied soldiers. The ship resumed duties in 1947 and continued her original route at Pireaus-New York, with occasional stops at Genoa, Lisbon, Naples, Malta and Halifax. In 1955 she stopped the Pireaus-New York route, replaced by the SS Olympia and was renamed New York and placed on a New York to Bremen service in 1955. Due to her age, the ship made her final voyage in 1959 and was retired shortly after and scrapped in 1961. Throughout her life she carried over 800.000 passengers, mainly Greek and European immigrants to Canada and the United States.
