= SeaPort Manatee =

- Interactive map of SeaPort Manatee

Location
- Country: United States
- Location: Manatee County, Florida
- Coordinates: 27°38′01″N 82°33′41″W
- UN/LOCODE: USPME

Details
- Opened: August 7, 1970
- Operated by: Manatee County Port Authority
- Owned by: Manatee County
- Size: 1,200 acres (4.9 km^{2})
- No. of berths: 10
- Draft depth: 40 ft
- Employees: 85
- Executive director: Carlos Buqueras
- Cranes: 7

Statistics
- Annual cargo tonnage: 11.85 million
- Value of cargo: $2.83 billion
- Website www.seaportmanatee.com

SeaPort Manatee (formerly Port Manatee) is a county-owned deepwater seaport located in the eastern Gulf of Mexico at the entrance to Tampa Bay in northern Manatee County, Florida. It is one of Florida's largest deepwater seaports and also regarded as the closest U.S. deepwater seaport to the Panama Canal. The port handles a variety of bulk, breakbulk, containerized, and heavy-lift project cargoes.

== History ==
Manatee County bought 357 acres (144 ha) in 1965 to launch a Barge Port and Industrial Port, which later became known as Port Manatee. The Florida Legislature established the Manatee County Port Authority (MCPA), which is the governing body for the port.

The first ship to dock at the port was M/V Fermland on August 7, 1970, unloading 2,000 tons of "Korean plywood". A formal dedication ceremony for the port was held on October 29, 1970. After the opening ceremony, an open house was held that day allowing members of the general public to visit the port. This open house was held for two more days after the opening ceremony occurred. In the 1970s the port was mainly involved with petroleum and phosphate.

By the 1980s, the port became more diversified. Berth 11 was built and Berth 12 played a role in rebuilding the Sunshine Skyway Bridge. During the winters of 1989 and 1990 a cruise ship named Southern Elegance sailed out of Port Manatee. Southern Elegance would sail out of Panama City during the summer. Southern Elegance pulled out citing competition from other cruise ships in Tampa Bay. Another cruise ship sailed out of Port Manatee the MS Regal Empress from Regal Cruises between 1993 and 2003 from Berth 9. The Regal Empress stopped sailing out of Port Manatee because it was seized by US Federal Marshalls on April 18, 2003, after a repair bill was not paid and the cruise line filed for bankruptcy.

A 50th anniversary celebration was scheduled in 2020 but was cancelled due to the COVID-19 pandemic.

In February 2022, the port was rebranded as SeaPort Manatee.

== Economy ==
SeaPort Manatee generates nearly $7.3 billion in annual economic impact while supporting more than 42,000 direct and indirect jobs, without the benefit of ad valorem taxes. The port handles approximately 11.85 million tons of cargo each year.

=== Primary imports ===
- Tropical fruits and vegetables
- Citrus juices and beverages
- Appliances
- Forestry products
- Refined petroleum products
- Finished phosphate fertilizers
- Aluminum
- Cement and cement clinker
- Steel
- Project cargo such as power plant and bridge components, heavy machinery, and over-sized vehicles

=== Primary exports ===
- Finished phosphate products
- Wood pulp
- Kraft paper and paper board
- Scrap iron and steel
- LNG Heat Exchangers
