= SS Northern Star (1961) =

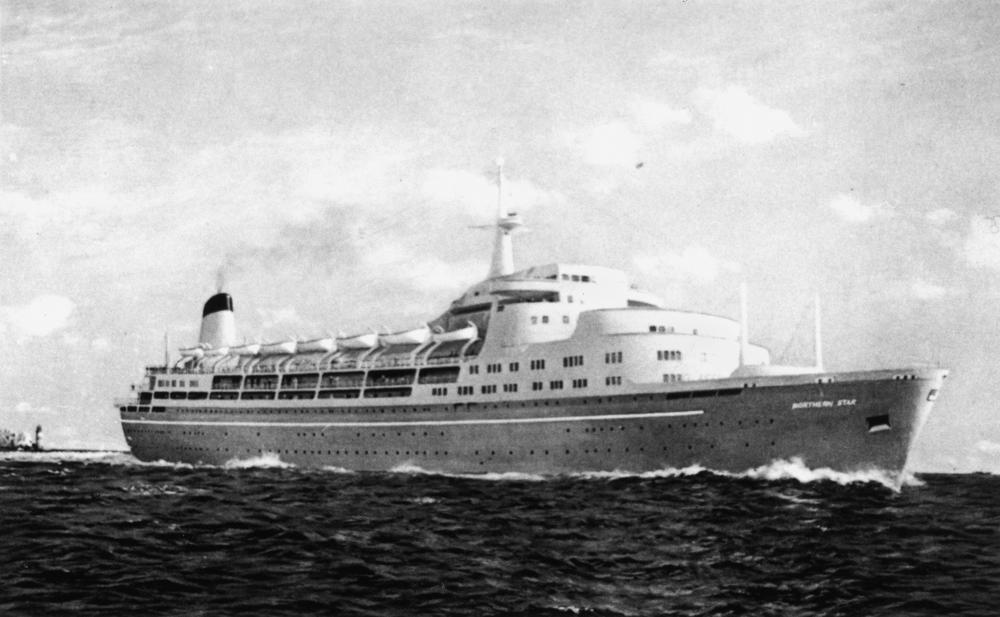
- Northern Star

History

United Kingdom
- Name: Northern Star
- Owner: Shaw, Savill & Albion Line
- Port of registry: Southampton
- Route: Southampton – Las Palmas – Cape Town – Durban – Fremantle – Melbourne – Sydney – Wellington – Auckland – Rarotonga – Tahiti – Acapulco – Panama – Curacao – Trinidad – Barbados – Lisbon – Southampton
- Builder: Vickers-Armstrongs, High Walker
- Yard number: 175
- Launched: 27 June 1961
- Completed: 26 June 1962
- In service: 10 July 1962
- Out of service: 1975
- Identification: 5257543
- Fate: Scrapped 1975

General characteristics
- Type: Ocean liner
- Tonnage: 24,731 GRT (1968, 23,983 GRT)
- Length: 650 ft (200 m)
- Beam: 83 ft (25 m)
- Installed power: 22,000 shp
- Propulsion: Geared turbines, twin screw
- Speed: 22 knots (41 km/h; 25 mph)
- Capacity: 1,437 tourist class

SS Northern Star was an ocean liner completed in 1962 for the United Kingdom-based Shaw, Savill & Albion Line's tourist class round the world service via South Africa and Australia. She was essentially an enlarged version of the Southern Cross, built seven years earlier. Northern Star sailed out via the Cape and home via Panama, while her fleet mate sailed out via Panama and home via the Cape.

== History ==
From the early 1970s she spent most of her time cruising, but was continually beset with mechanical problems due to inadequate maintenance. With the great increase in oil prices in 1973/4 she became uneconomic and would have required an expensive and time-consuming refit to make up for the deferred maintenance and so was withdrawn from service at the end of her 1975 summer cruise programme. In spite of being only twelve years old her poor mechanical condition made her unattractive to other operators and she was sold for scrapping. On 11 December 1975 she arrived at Kaohsiung to be broken up by Li Chong Steel and Iron Works.

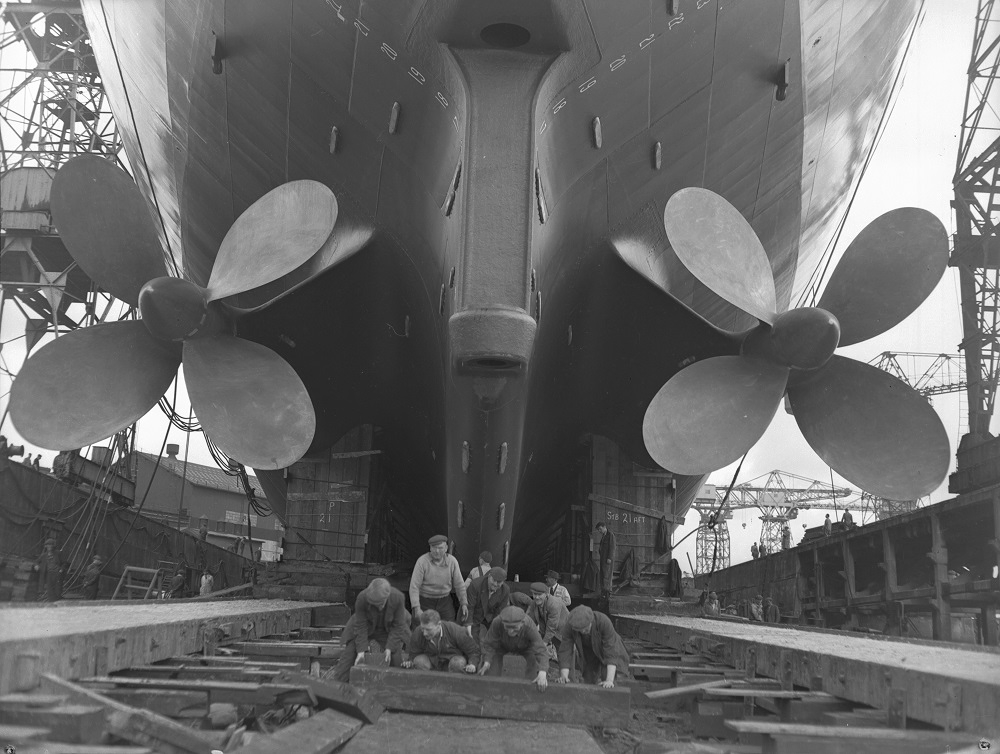
Ship on the slipway prior to launching
