= Celebration Cruise Line =

Former cruise line

- Type: Subsidiary
- Industry: Transportation
- Founded: 2008
- Defunct: 2015
- Fate: Replaced by Bahamas Paradise Cruise Line
- Headquarters: Riviera Beach, Florida, United States
- Area served: The Bahamas
- Products: Cruises
- Parent: Celebration Cruise Holdings
- Website: BahamaShips.com

Celebration Cruise Line was a small cruise line that operated two-day voyages out of Port of Palm Beach to Grand Bahama Island. The company was founded in late 2008, and began operations on March 9, 2009. The company moved the ship's operations from Port Everglades to the Port of Palm Beach in March 2010.

== History ==
The cruise line began operation in March 2009 with the Bahamas Celebration, which was formerly a cruise ferry, built in 1981 and converted to a cruise ship in 2008. The cruise line replaced Imperial Majesty Cruise Line.

In 2010, Celebration Cruise Line announced it would be moving to the Port of Palm Beach due to being overshadowed by larger cruise lines at Port Everglades. The Port of Palm Beach has a passenger terminal that was built to accommodate smaller cruise ships. In 2010, they stopped sailing to Nassau, Bahamas. Their two-night cruises then departed every other day at 6:00 pm. to Freeport, Bahamas.

On October 31, 2014, the Bahamas Celebration struck an unknown object while departing from Freeport, creating a small hole in the ship's hull and resulting in the vessel listing 10 degrees to port. All passengers and crew were unharmed.

Celebration Cruise Line ceased operations following the grounding incident. Former Celebration Cruise Line executives formed Bahamas Paradise Cruise Line and purchased the Grand Celebration to take over the route formerly operated by the Bahamas Celebration.

== Former fleet ==
Ship	Built	In Service for Celebration Cruise Line	Tonnage	Flag	Notes	Image
Bahamas Celebration	1981	2009–2014	35,483 GT	Bahamas	On October 31, 2014, Bahamas Celebration struck an unknown object while departing from Freeport, opening up a small hole in the port side. The ship was able to return to the port and all passengers and crew were able to disembark and no injuries were reported. As of 3 November 2014, the hole had been patched, but the ship was still listing by about 10 percent and salvage crews were trying to assess the damage. In December 2014 it was announced that the ship could not be repaired and would be replaced by the MS Grand Celebration, which would be operated by the newly formed Bahamas Paradise Cruise Line.	
