= Greek Line =

Greek passengership company

General Steam Navigation Company of Greece
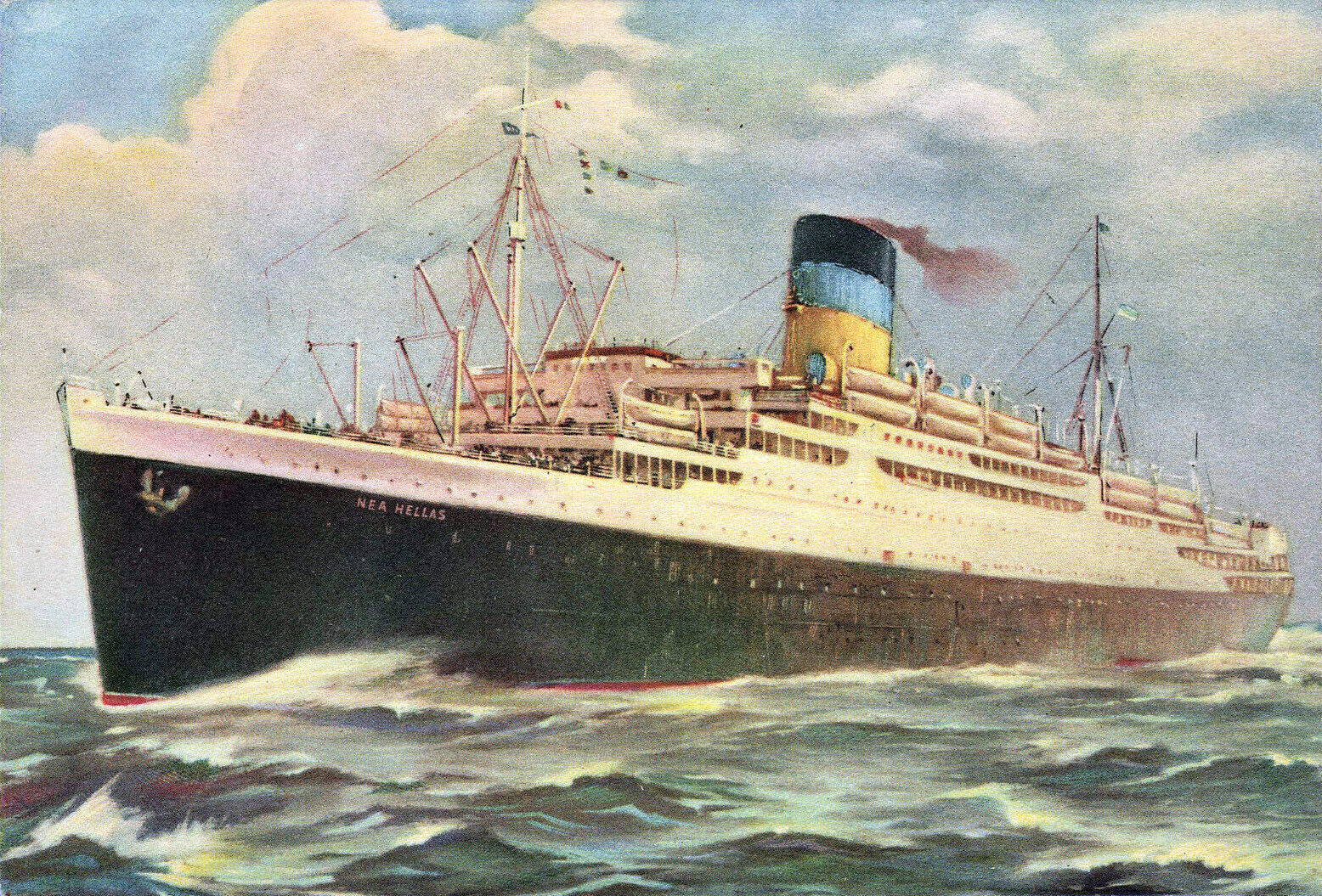
- A painting of the line's first ship, the Nea Hellas
- Industry: Transportation
- Founded: 1939
- Founder: Vasilis Goulandris and brothers
- Defunct: 1975
- Headquarters: Piraeus, Greece
- Area served: Transatlantic
- Services: Transatlantic crossings Short-to-long distance voyages Leisure cruises
- Parent: Ormos Shipping Company

The Greek Line, formally known as the General Steam Navigation Company of Greece, was a passenger ship line that operated from 1939 to 1975. The Greek Line was owned by the Ormos Shipping Company.

The Greek Line was founded in 1939 with the acquisition of the former SS Tuscania, renamed the Nea Hellas. It operated transatlantic voyages until Greece entered World War II, becoming a troopship for the Allies.

The line continued to operate transatlantic and other short-to-long-distance voyages, but later began operating leisure cruises as the Jet Age replaced passenger ships as the means of transportation across the Atlantic Ocean.

In 1953, the Greek Line ordered the SS Olympia, the only ship operated by the line that wasn't a second-hand purchase.

In December 1963, Greek Line's cruise ship TSMS Lakonia caught fire and sank, killing 128 people.

The company ran into financial difficulties in the early 1970s. Bankruptcy followed in 1975 and the last two ships, SS Olympia and SS Queen Anna Maria, were sold. The Queen Anna Maria ultimately became the Carnivale, which was the second ship to sail for the newly formed Carnival Cruise Lines, today one of the largest cruise lines in the world.

None of the Greek Line's former ships are still in operation. The last surviving ship, the Olympia, was retired and sold for scrap in spring 2009.

== Ships operated by the Greek Line ==
Ship	Year built	Sailed for Greek Line	Gross tonnage	Notes
Nea Hellas, later New York	1922	1939–1959	16,991 GT	First ship to operate for the Greek Line. She was scrapped in 1961.
Katoomba, later Columbia	1913	1946–1957	9,424 GT	
Neptunia	1920	1948–1957	Unknown	
Canberra	1913	1948–1954	Unknown	
Olympia	1953	1953–1975	21,909 GT	The first and only newbuild for the line. She was converted into a cruise ship during the late 1970s and early 1980s. She was later known as the Caribe, Caribe I, and the Regal Empress. She was the last surviving ship until she was sold for scrap in early 2009.
Arkadia	1931	1958–1966	20,260 GT	Originally built as the Monarch of Bermuda
Lakonia	1930	1963	19,040 GT	Destroyed by fire during a voyage in December 1963. The fire was responsible for the loss of 128 people. The ship sank soon after.
Queen Anna Maria	1956	1968–1975	25,516 GT	Formerly the Empress Of Britain. She later became the Carnivale, Fiesta Marina, Olympic, and The Topaz. She was sold for scrap in 2008.
