= Commodore Cruise Line =

Cruise line

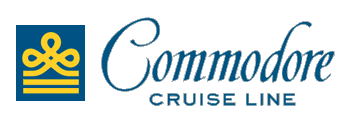
- Industry: Cruise line
- Founded: 1966
- Defunct: 2001
- Fate: Bankrupt
- Headquarters: Hollywood, Florida, United States
- Key people: Sanford Chobol, Edwin Stephan
- Parent: 1981–1990: Rederi Ab Sally; 1990–1995: EffJohn; 1995–2001: JeMJ Financial Services
- Subsidiaries: 1999–2001: Crown Cruise Line
- Website: Commodorecruise.com

Commodore Cruise Line was a United States–based cruise line that was in operation from 1968 until 2001. It was founded in 1966 by Sanford Chobol and Edwin Stephan. Following multiple changes in ownership, the company declared bankruptcy in 2001 due to rising fuel costs and increased competition from other cruise lines. It had its headquarters in Hollywood, Florida.

== History ==
=== 1966–1981 ===
Commodore Cruise Line was founded in 1966—the same year that Norwegian Caribbean Line begun operations—by Sanford Chobol and Edwin Stephan. Chobol, a Florida hotelier, had previously operated the Brazilian ocean liner Princess Leopoldina on a series of cruises out of Florida in 1962. In order to operate a ship that could successfully compete against NCL's MS Sunward (1966), Commodore reached an agreement with the Sweden-based Wallenius Lines, who acquired the build contract of a half-complete ferry under construction at Wärtsilä Turku Shipyard in Finland. The ship in question had been ordered by the Sweden-based Lion Ferry as a combined ferry/cruise ship, but Lion Ferry had subsequently cancelled the order. Wallenius Lines named the incomplete ship MS Bohème and had her completed as cruise ship. Following delivery the Bohème was chartered to Commodore, and she set on her first cruise from Miami to Saint Thomas on 7 December 1968. With the Bohème Commodore Cruise Line became the first company to operate week-long cruises out of Florida around the year.

By 1973, Lion Ferry and Fred. Olsen had acquired interests in Commodore. As a result, Lion Ferry's MS Bolero joined the Bohème in Commodore fleet for the Northern Hemisphere winter seasons of 1973 to 1976 (the Bolero spent summers in United States—Canada ferry service for Lion Ferry). In 1976, the Bolero was replaced by another ferry, MS Caribe, that was also used by Commodore during the winters and United States–Canada ferry service during the summers. Like the Bohème, the Caribe was registered in West Germany during her service with Commodore.

=== 1981–1995 ===
In 1981, Commodore Cruise Line was acquired by the Finland-based Rederi Ab Sally, who also acquired the Bohème from Wallenius Lines. As a result of the change of ownership the Bohème was re-registered to Panama. During the same year Sally acquired two ships for conversion into service with Commodore. The first, Karageorgis Lines' MS Navarino, had recently been damaged in a grounding. However, during rebuilding she suffered a fire, followed by capsizing of the drydock, which left the ship so badly damaged that Sally decided to abandon their plans for the ship. The second acquisition, the former Greek Line ship SS Olympia, was rebuilt with diesel engines and entered service for Commodore in 1983 as MS Caribe I. Following the Caribe I's entry into service the Bohème was also rebuilt, re-entering service in 1984. However, in 1986, the Bohème was sold to the Church of Scientology, and Commodore reverted to operating just one ship.

By the mid-1980s, Rederi Ab Sally was in financial difficulties, and in 1987 the company was sold to its main competitors Effoa and Johnson Line, based in Finland and Sweden, respectively. Two years later the passenger operations of Sally, Effoa and Johnson were merged into EffJohn. In 1990, EffJohn decided to merge the operations of Bermuda Star and Queen of Bermuda to the Commodore fleet under the names Enchanted Isle and Enchanted Seas respectively. Promotional material from 1991 advertised the addition of two further ships in 1992/1993, but these did not materialize. Instead the Caribe I was sold to Regal Cruise Line in 1993. In 1994, the Enchanted Isle became a floating hotel in Saint Petersburg, Russia, returning to the Commodore fleet the following year.

=== 1995–2001 ===
By the mid-1990s, EffJohn in turn was in financial difficulties, and decided to concentrate on its core market in the Baltic Sea. As a result, Commodore Cruise Line was sold in 1995 to the New York–based JeMJ Financial Services. The new owners continued operations with the Enchanted Isle and Enchanted Seas until 1996, when the Enchanted Seas was sold to World Explorer Lines. In 1998, MS Island Holiday was chartered from a Ukrainian company and renamed MS Enchanted Capri. Both the Enchanted Capri and Enchanted Isle were based in New Orleans at the time. In 1999 the Commodore fleet grew again to three ships for the first time with the acquisition of MS Enchanted Sun.

In 1999, Commodore reactivated the Crown Cruise Line brand (which had also been previously owned by EffJohn but ceased operations in 1997) as a more upscale brand. During the following years Commodore was facing harsh competition from larger cruise lines that were beginning to push down their prices. As a result, Commodore filed for bankruptcy in January 2001.

== Ships ==
Ship	Built	In service for Commodore	Tonnage	Status as of 2022	Photos of the Ships
MS Bohème	1968	1968–1986	10,328 GRT	Since 1986 MS Freewinds for the Church of Scientology	The M.S Bohéme as M.S Freewinds.
MS Bolero	1973	1973–1976 (winters only)	11,344 GRT	Scrapped in 2018	M.S Bolero as M.S Louis Aura in Tallinn 2015.
MS Caribe	1968	1976–1981 (winters only)	10,448 GRT	Scrapped 2012	M.S Caribe as M.V Discovery Sun in the Port Everglades, Florida
MS Navarino	1957	Never entered service	17,392 GRT	Sunk 2001 as MS Sea	MS Navarino as M.S Gripsholm in 1958.
MS Caribe I	1953	1983–1993	22,979 GRT	Scrapped 2009	M.S Caribe l as M.S Regal Empress in Nassau 2008.
SS Enchanted Isle	1958	1990–1994, 1995–2001	23,395 GRT	Scrapped 2003	The M.S Enchanted Isle in Kiel, 1994
SS Enchanted Seas	1958	1990–1996	23,500 GRT	Scrapped 2004	The M.S Enchanted Seas as M.S Universe Explorer docked at Canada in 1997
MS Enchanted Capri	1975	1998–2001	16,331 GRT	Since 2020, wrecked on a beach in Mexico, partially scrapped.	The M.S Enchanted Capri as M.S Azerbaidjan (Soviet Ship) in 1981.
MS Enchanted Sun	1974	1999–2001	7,764 GRT	Since 2006 MS Casino Royale for Royale Prime Co	
