= FleetPro Passenger Ship Management =

Defunct shipping company

FleetPro Passenger Ship Management was founded in 2012 as a merger of two existing passenger ship management companies and is based in Switzerland. It combined International Shipping Partners (ISP), a passenger ship management services company headquartered in Miami, Florida, United States, and River Advice of Basel, Switzerland. The majority owners became a Netherlands-based private equity fund. In January 2014, the two operations were renamed FleetPro Ocean and FleetPro River respectively. The company was bought out in November 2015 and later rebranded into CMI Leisure, which was then bought by Anglo-Eastern Leisure Management in March 2023, becoming Anglo-Eastern Cruise Management.

Management and administrative services provided include deck and engine manning, maintenance, drydockings, inspections, conversions, upgradings and volume purchasing.

== Former sea-going fleet ==
- Akademik Ioffe
- Akademik Sergey Vavilov
- Ambassador II
- Batanga Queen/Discovery Sun
- Beauport
- Caribbean Carrier (freight roro)
- Clipper Pearl/Clipper Pacific/Festival/Ocean Pearl
- Dolphin IV
- Enchanted Capri
- Europa Jet/Club Royale
- Island Breeze/The Big Red Boat III
- Island Sky
- Kapitan Khlebnikov
- Manistal/St Tropez
- Maya Express (freight roro)
- OceanBreeze
- Ocean Pearl
- Ola Esmeralda
- Palm Beach Princess
- MS Regal Empress
- Regal Voyager
- Rembrandt
- Royal Star
- Scandinavian Dawn/Discovery Dawn/Island Dawn
- Scandinavian Song/Santiago de Cuba/The Empress
- Scandinavian Star
- Seabreeze I, which sank in suspicious conditions in 2000.
- Seawind Crown
- Sonia
- Sun Fiesta
- The Big Red Boat II

== Current sea-going fleet ==
FleetPro's fleet consists of mid- to small-size passenger vessels:

- Bahamas Celebration
- Clipper Odyssey/Silver Discoverer
- Freewinds
- Gemini
- Oasia
- Ocean Atlantic
- Ocean Diamond
- Ocean Endeavour
- Ocean Nova
- Perla (general cargo ship)
- Quest
- Scotia Prince/Prince
- Sea Adventurer
- Sea Discoverer
- Sea Explorer
- Sea Spirit
- Sea Voyager. ISP helped bring the vessel out of layup in 2010, to be used in providing accommodations for World Food Programme staff engaged in relief efforts in earthquake-stricken Haiti
- Warrior Spirit

FleetPro also operate over forty inland waterways cruise vessels.
