= Freewinds =

Church of Scientology's ship

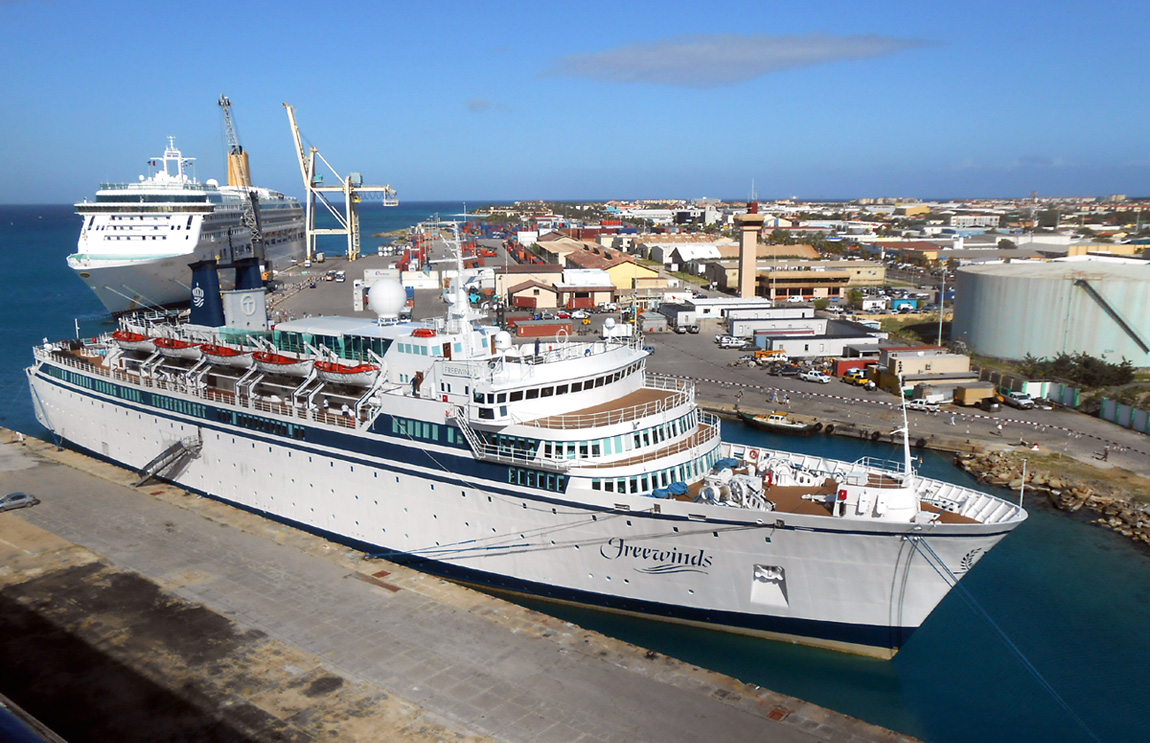
- Freewinds berthed at Aruba

History
- Name: 1968–1985: Bohème; 1985–onwards: Freewinds
- Owner: 1968–1981: Wallenius Bremen; 1981–1985: Hanseatic Caribbean Shipping Co; 1985 onwards: San Donato Properties Corporation
- Operator: 1968–1982: Commodore Cruise Line; 1982–1983: Saitecin Cruises; 1984: Commodore Cruise Line; 1984–1985: SeaEscape; 1985: Commodore Cruise Line; 1985-present: Majestic Cruise Lines
- Port of registry: 1968–1981: Bremen, West Germany; 1981–onwards: Panama City, Panama
- Builder: Wärtsilä Turku Shipyard, Turku, Finland
- Yard number: 1161
- Launched: 12 February 1968
- Acquired: 12 November 1968
- Maiden voyage: November 1968
- In service: 7 December 1968
- Identification: IMO number: 6810811; Call sign: H9CK; MMSI number: 354993000
- Status: Active

General characteristics (as built)
- Class & type: Finnhansa class passenger ship
- Tonnage: 10,328 GRT; 7,500 DWT
- Length: 134.16 m (440 ft 2 in)
- Beam: 21.04 m (69 ft 0 in)
- Draught: 5.50 m (18 ft 1 in)
- Installed power: 2 × Wärtsilä-Sulzer 2SA 8RD56 diesels; combined 10444 kW (14.000BHP)
- Propulsion: Two propellers
- Speed: 20 knots (37 km/h; 23 mph)
- Capacity: 540 passengers

General characteristics (as Freewinds)
- Tonnage: 9,780 GT
- Length: 134.32 m (440 ft 8 in)
- Beam: 21.04 m (69 ft 0 in)
- Draught: 5.748 m (18 ft 10.3 in)
- Depth: 7.3 m (23 ft 11 in)
- Ice class: 1A
- Capacity: 360 passengers

MV Freewinds is a former cruise ship operated by International Shipping Partners and owned by San Donato Properties, a company affiliated with the Church of Scientology. She was built in 1968 by Wärtsilä Turku Shipyard in Turku, Finland, for Wallenius Lines as MS Bohème for service with Commodore Cruise Line. She was the first cruise ship built in Finland. Her ownership passed to a Church of Scientology–controlled company in 1985.

== Concept and construction ==
The ship that eventually became known as the Freewinds was originally ordered by the Sweden-based Lion Ferry as the second in a pair of two car/passenger ferries for use on their new Bremerhaven (West Germany)–Harwich (United Kingdom) service, with provisions made for cruise service during the Northern Hemisphere winter season. The ships shared the same design as Finnhansa and Finnpartner, that were under construction for Finnlines at Wärtsilä Helsinki Shipyard at the time. The ships ordered by Lion Ferry were built at Wärtsilä's Turku Shipyard, and the first of them, Prins Hamlet, was delivered to her owners on 14 May 1966. However, the passenger demand on the Bremerhaven–Harwich route proved to be insufficient for two ships, and Lion Ferry cancelled the order for a second ship, which was to be named "Prins Albert".

Meanwhile, the newly founded Commodore Cruise Line was looking for ships to operate on cruises around the Caribbean. An agreement was reached where the build contract of the half-complete ship was sold to the Sweden-based Wallenius Lines, which would have the ship completed as a cruise ship and, following completion, she would be chartered to Commodore Cruise Lines. Following their tradition of naming ships after operas, Wallenius decided to name the ship Bohème, after La bohème. Cabins were added in place of the car decks on the ship (although bow or stern doors were never fitted on her), and her superstructure was redesigned to better accommodate the need for sundeck space in the warmer climates. Bohème was delivered to Wallenius Bremen, Wallenius Lines' West Germany-based subsidiary, on 12 November 1968. She was registered in West Germany, with Bremerhaven as her home port.

== Service history ==
=== 1968–1981: Wallenius Lines ownership ===
Following delivery the Bohème sailed to Stockholm, the location of Wallenius Lines' headquarters, for a presentation to invited guests. On departing Stockholm for Miami she carried her first paying passengers on board. Her maiden voyage was cut short however, as she hit an underwater cliff outside Dalarö in the Stockholm Archipelago. The cliff breached the ship's hull and fuel tanks. Lifeboats were used to evacuate all passengers from the listing ship, and three days later she was refloated and towed to the Finnboda shipyard in Nacka for week-long repairs. After the repairs she again left for Miami, this time without passengers.

On 7 December 1968, the Bohème left on her first cruise from Miami to Saint Thomas. During her first year in service, the ship experienced notable air conditioning problems due to its shipyard's inexperience with ships destined for the warm Caribbean climate. As a result, she returned to Europe in 1980, sailing to the Blohm + Voss shipyard in Hamburg, West Germany where the air conditioning system was rebuilt, and an additional screw compressor as well as two freshwater generators were installed. Following the rebuild, the Bohème re-entered service with a Miami–Puerto Plata–Saint Thomas–San Juan–Cap-Haïtien–Miami itinerary. She followed the same itinerary all year long, becoming the first ship to offer year-round seven-night cruises from Miami. She was also the first cruise ship to call at Puerto Plata and the first to offer regular sailings to Cap Haitien.

=== 1981–1986: Rederi Ab Sally ownership ===
In March 1981, Commodore Cruise Line, as well as the Bohème, were sold to the Finland-based Rederi Ab Sally. The new owners re-registered the Bohème in Panama, leading to the resignation of most of the German officers due to worsened working conditions. The resigning officers were replaced with Scandinavians. The following year, the German deck and engine crews were replaced by Filipinos. Originally, the new crew members were meant for Navarino, a former ocean liner (ex Gripsholm 1957) Sally had purchased for conversion into service with Commodore Cruise Line. However, after the Navarino was severely damaged following the capsizing of its dry dock, the conversion plans were abandoned. The crew already hired for the Navarino was transferred to the Bohème.

Between November 1982 and August 1983, the Bohème was chartered to Brazilia-based Saitecin Cruises for cruises around South America. She also made one cruise from Miami under this charter. Following this charter, the ship again returned to West Germany to be rebuilt, this time in Bremerhaven, where two new diesel generators were installed and much of the interior decorations replaced. While in Bremerhaven, she also received a new external livery. On returning to service in 1984, the Bohème was placed on a new Miami–Port-au-Prince–Port Antonio–Grand Cayman–Cozumel–Miami itinerary. The schedule proved to be too tight to maintain, especially in poor weather conditions. With engine problems causing further issues, this itinerary only lasted until November 1984, when the ship was chartered to SeaEscape for its Miami–Freeport ferry service.

In February 1985, the Bohème returned to Commodore Cruise Line service. Her port of departure was changed to Saint Petersburg, Florida, to better cater to the needs of Commodore's main clientele, retired people living on Florida's west coast. The ship's new seven-day itinerary was Saint Petersburg–Key West–Port Antonio–Cozumel–Saint Petersburg. The new route proved to be short-lived, as the Bohème was sold to San Donato Properties Corporation in September 1986 for US$10 million (equivalent to $29,372,000 in 2025), to be converted for use with the Church of Scientology.

=== 1986 onwards: Scientology acquisition and ownership ===
In 1984, the Church of Scientology's parent body, the Church of Scientology International (CSI), decided to acquire a ship on which to deliver high-level Scientology courses. According to a statement by the Church:

CSI believed that an ocean-going vessel would be the most appropriate facility for ministering New OT VIII because this advanced level of religious service requires a completely safe, aesthetic and distraction-free environment and because L. Ron Hubbard, the religion's founder, had researched and ministered the first OT levels aboard a ship in the late 1960s. A ship therefore would have particular religious significance to Scientologists.

The Flag Ship Trust (FST) entity was formed in December 1985 with the aid of a US$5 million donation from the International Association of Scientologists. In September 1986, the FST purchased Bohème, renamed her Freewinds, and refitted her to enable use for Scientology purposes. Lawrence Woodcraft, a licensed British architect in the Sea Org, was chosen by FST to be the "Chief Architect" of the ship. Upon arrival, Woodcraft discovered that he was not doing any design work but only producing working drawings of renderings and sketches by the "LRH Architects" Barry and Carol Stein (whom Woodcraft later found out were not licensed architects). The designs were full of functional defects, such as moving the dining room two decks up without the kitchen and replacing the existing dining room with a course room (causing disturbances from the noise from the kitchen). When Woodcraft pointed out such defects, he was overruled, and in the case of the restaurant, senior managers ordered an elevator to be installed, which required cutting through steel floors, threatening the ship's structural integrity. Woodcraft and the chief of the renovations, Steve Kozaki, were unsure about the composition of the walls. Kozaki slammed a hammer into a wall, releasing a powdery substance that Woodcraft immediately identified as asbestos. He later confirmed it when he found the original Finnish blueprints, which clearly labeled "asbestos" insulation all over the ship. Woodcraft confronted the Chief Engineer, Wack Alcock, who immediately denied having asbestos and claimed it was just "insulation." Woodcraft informed multiple people, who all disregarded his warnings, except Bitty Miscavige, the sister-in-law of Scientology head David Miscavige, who supervised the project. Bitty immediately became concerned and tried to resolve the issue, but decided not to after Alcock could not find anything about asbestos in L Ron Hubbard's literature and reminded Bitty of Scientology doctrine, which held that cancer was caused by "sexual misconduct," not asbestos. Further damage was caused when one of Hubbard's writings was found to criticize fiberglass, as a consequence of which Sea Org ordered the removal of all the fiberglass protecting the ship from the Caribbean sun.

Once construction started, Woodcraft witnessed how Sea Org members without experience in maritime engineering or interior design were brought without pay, carelessly ripping into the interiors, ventilation, and plumbing, releasing asbestos all over the ship. Many Sea Org members were covered head-to-toe with asbestos, with one individual, after being warned about it by Woodcraft, dismissing his concern and biting into the asbestos. The ship's construction fell vastly behind schedule and over budget, so Scientology management contracted "CCL," a professional ship refitting company based out of Southampton working primarily in Miami. Upon arrival, CCL Engineers were shocked and outraged by the ship's condition and the asbestos contamination, threatening to report them to the authorities. Scientology management allegedly paid CCL extra money, fearing a significant public relations issue. They compromised to have Sea Org members spray contaminated areas with water in a useless attempt to prevent the asbestos from becoming airborne. Eventually, relations with CCL broke down, and they left without performing any work. It was then decided to recruit non-Sea Org Scientologists with the necessary skills to complete the construction. The vessel was placed back into service in June 1988.

The ownership and management of the vessel was organized through a complicated web of Scientology-run corporations and entities, most of which are owned by the FST. It is owned by San Donato Properties, a Panamanian corporation of which FST is the sole shareholder. Another FST-owned Panamanian corporation, Transcorp Services, owns the mortgage on the Freewinds. FSS Organization was a Netherlands Antilles corporation responsible for paying certain taxes on the vessel to the Netherlands Antilles authorities. Scientology courses are delivered aboard the vessel by the Flag Ship Service Organization (FSSO), in effect a floating branch of the Church of Scientology. Majestic Cruise Lines is a Panamanian corporation which operates the Freewinds, receiving payment from FSSO for the use of the ship. MCL Services is a corporation in the Netherlands Antilles that provides shore support and liaison services for Majestic Cruise Lines and FSSO from the home port of the Freewinds, Curaçao.

Following the Church of Scientology's tax exemption agreement with the U.S. Internal Revenue Service in 1993, these arrangements were simplified. The responsibilities of the Majestic Cruise Lines were to be transferred to FSSO, with Majestic itself being dissolved, and FSS Organization being dissolved as it was no longer required for tax reporting purposes in the Netherlands Antilles. However, as of 1999 the Majestic company was continuing to bill visitors to the Freewinds.

Freewinds is the fifth ship to be owned by the Church of Scientology. The other four were Royal Scotsman (later Apollo), Enchanter (later Diana), Avon River (later Athena), and Nekambi, all of which have apparently been scrapped. However, the nameplate of Diana has been preserved and is on display aboard Freewinds. The church also operated two World War II surplus ships from the late 1960s until the early 1970s. These were Bolivar, a subchaser, and T.S.M.Y. Excalibur. Both of these vessels were docked at San Pedro, California, and were used for training new Sea Org members.

== Scientology use ==
Freewinds is the exclusive training center for OT VIII (Operating Thetan Level 8), the highest level of Scientology and the last of the published OT levels. Members of the Church of Scientology who have reached the highest levels must receive their training on the Freewinds.

Besides the OT VIII training, Freewinds is used for delivering lower-level classes, auditing services, and recreational activities for Scientologists. The ship hosts a "Freewinds Maiden Voyage" each June as an "OT Summit" for high-ranking Scientologists at which Scientology accomplishments and plans for the future are celebrated.

A significant portion of the ship is given over to its use as a religious retreat for Scientologists. In addition to various course rooms and a library of L. Ron Hubbard books, Freewinds has areas given over to the Religious Technology Center, Sea Org and International Association of Scientologists. As is common practice in other Scientology organizations, the ship also has an "LRH Office" symbolically set aside for L. Ron Hubbard's use (Hubbard died in January 1986, approximately nine months before the vessel was purchased).

== Allegations of abuse onboard ==
In 2011, former Sea Org member Valeska Paris reported that she had been imprisoned onboard Freewinds to prevent her from leaving Scientology, after joining at age 14. Once she was taken to the ship, expecting to be onboard two weeks, Paris said her passport was taken from her, after which she was held against her will, forced into manual labor for 12 years, and unable to leave the ship without an escort for six years.

Her story was corroborated by a former Sea Org member who said "[Valeska] made it very clear she did not want to be there. She had been sent to the ship so as not to be in contact with one of her parents and that's not what she wanted, she was very, very distressed." The Church of Scientology has denied the claims.

In 2022, Valeska Paris, along with Gawain Baxter and his wife Laura Baxter, filed a related lawsuit against the Church of Scientology. On April 3, six weeks after the magistrate ruled Miscavige as served, US District Judge Tom Barber ruled that the plaintiffs must seek relief from Church arbitration and not the courts. Some of the plaintiffs' arguments were dismissed because ruling on them would require the courts to interpret religious doctrine, which is inconsistent with the First Amendment, said Barber.

== Environmental issues ==
In April 2008, the Freewinds was shut down after blue asbestos was discovered by government health inspectors during maintenance by the Curaçao Drydock Company. Blue asbestos is the most dangerous form of asbestos, and the ship was reported to be "extensively contaminated". According to InsuranceNewsNet, "Decontamination, if it is even possible, is likely to cost tens of millions of dollars and would result in the ship being in dry dock for many months."

The discovery confirmed a 2001 allegation made by former Scientologist Lawrence Woodcraft, who had overseen the original renovation of the Freewinds in 1987. The Captain also admitted that during previous maintenance performed by his personnel, asbestos was released into the ventilation system but not reported.

The Church of Scientology denied that there is an asbestos problem, commenting in May 2008 that "there is not now and never has been a situation of asbestos exposure on the Freewinds." Karin Pouw, spokesperson for the Church of Scientology, told Radar Magazine that the air quality on the ship was regularly tested and "always meets or exceeds US standards". The Church contracted Nordica Engineering to perform renovations on the Freewinds and denied the presence of blue asbestos during talks. To remove material from the ship, Nordica brought in 240 Polish workers, who lived on the Freewinds for a month and a half. When workers told Nordica there was blue asbestos on the ship, they stopped renovations and workers returned to Poland. Witold Maliński stated that Nordica was looking to demand compensation on behalf of its workers.

The Freewinds has been noted in Bonaire for the amount of waste water it dumps into the island's inland waste pit.

== 2019 measles quarantine ==
In May 2019, the Freewinds was placed in quarantine by the island of Saint Lucia during a visit, after a confirmed case of measles on board. Dr. Merlene Fredericks-James, Saint Lucia's chief medical officer, said in a statement: "Because of the risk of potential infection, not just from the confirmed measles case but from other persons who may be on the boat at the time, we thought it prudent to make a decision not to allow anyone to disembark."

The ship left Saint Lucia on 2 May en route to its home port of Curaçao. The measles case was identified as a female crew member.

== Design ==
=== Exterior design ===
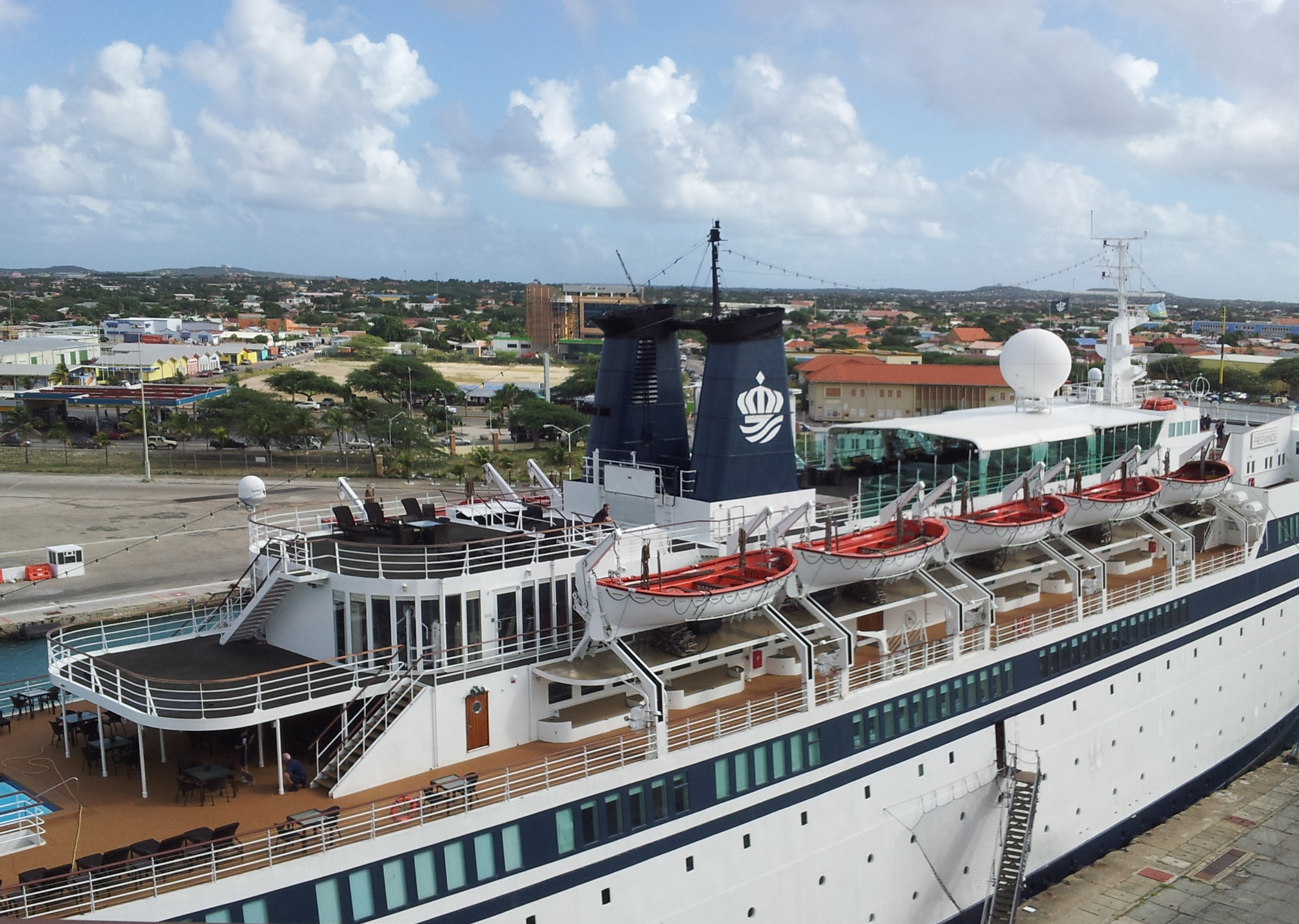
View of the upper decks of the Freewinds

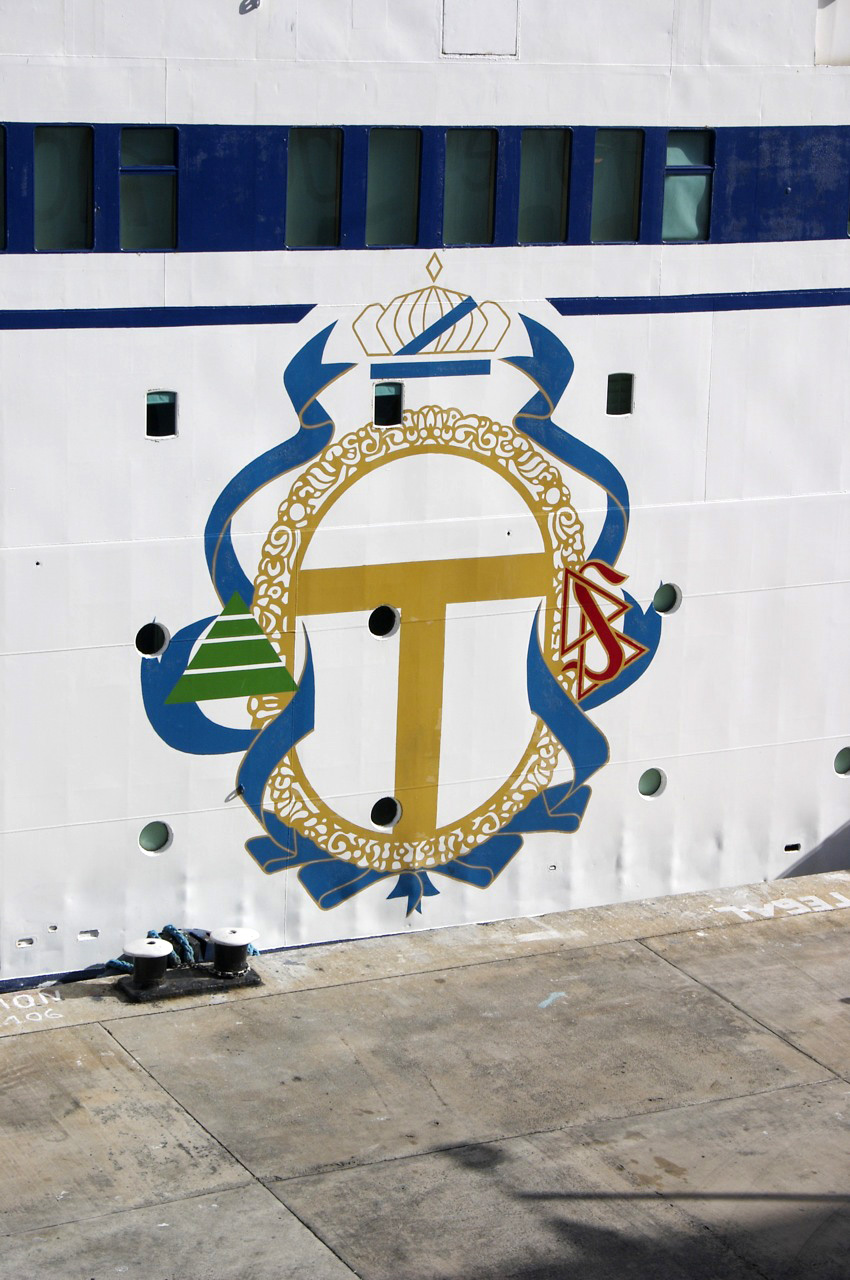
Logo on the side of the Freewinds, incorporating the OT, Dianetics, Scientology and Majestic Cruise Lines logos (centre, left, right and above, respectively).

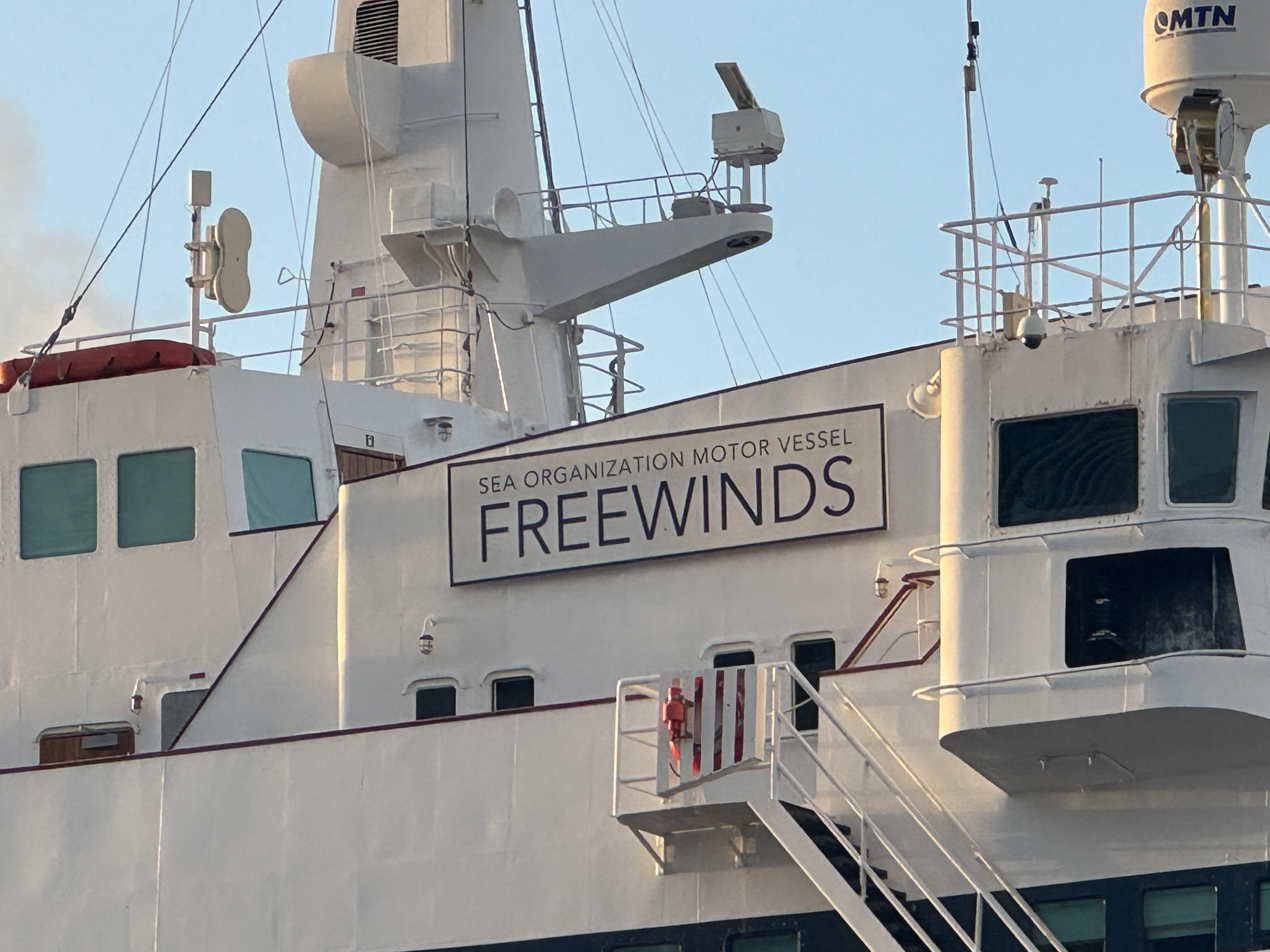
Sign on the Freewinds that reads "Sea Organization Motor Vessel" and "Freewinds"

The exterior design of the Bohème/Freewinds is very similar to the Finnhansa-class ships built as ferries. She has a moderately raked and slightly rounded bow, rounded forward superstructure, terraced rear superstructure and two slim side-by-side funnels. She differs from her sisters with the superstructure expanding further on promenade deck (on the other ships it only extends as far as the bridge), swimming pool added to the rear of promenade deck, and the observation lounge missing from the topmost deck; this was replaced by an open sunbathing area.

As built the Bohème was painted in Wallenius Lines livery, with an all-white hull and superstructure, yellow radar mast and yellow funnels with a wide horizontal green stripe painted on them and the letters OW (for Olof Wallenius) painted on the stripe. The ship only kept this livery until her first visit to Miami, where she was repainted in the Commodore Cruise Line livery, with white funnels and radar mast. A dark blue decorative stripe was later painted on the hull. During the 1983 refit the livery of the Bohème was more radically altered, when blue stripes were painted along the windows on main and promenade decks, as well as the bridge windows. The funnels were re-painted with a spray-shaped design in blue, red and yellow.

Following acquisition by the Church of Scientology the ship's external appearance was changed slightly from the final Commodore livery; the Freewinds received dark blue funnels with the Majestic Cruise Lines logo on them, while an intricate combination of Scientology-related symbols was painted on both sides of the hull (pictured on the right). Additionally three decorative ribands were painted on the side of the hull towards the rear.

=== Interior design ===
Members of the Wallenius family were heavily involved in the interior design of the Bohème. Margareta Wallenius in particular involved herself in the ship's interior design, having her say in the materials used and works of art brought in from promising artists in Paris. Reflecting the company tradition of naming ships after operas, all public rooms on board were originally named after themes related to Puccini's La bohème, the opera that had given the ship its name.

Her sister ships were built for ferry service, and cabins were built on Bohème's planned car-decks on B- and C-decks. The car decks had in fact been originally planned to accommodate temporary cabin modules during the winter when Lion Ferry, the company that had originally ordered the Bohème, planned to use her for cruising to the Canary Isles. Additionally, a small gymnasium and cinema were added in place of the cargo hold on D-deck. All stairways and public rooms were panelled in light Nordic woods, while the deluxe cabins received dark oak panelings. During the 1983 refit, much of the original panelling was replaced by colourful paintings or mirrors to give an increased sense of space. Similarly, much of the upholstery and carpets were replaced with more cheerfully colored ones.

== See also ==
- List of cruise ships
