= SS Brasil (1957) =

Ocean liner

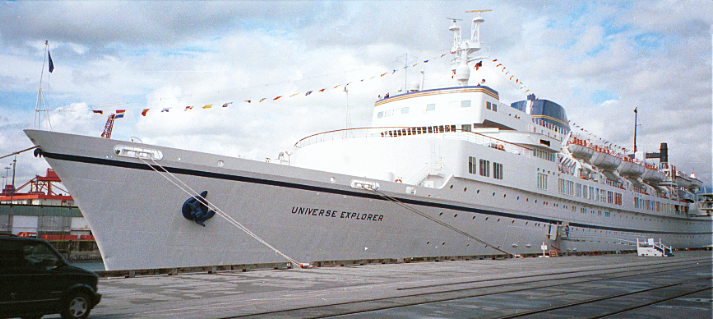
- ex-Brasil as Universe Explorer, 1997

History
- Name: 1958-1972: Brasil; 1972-1978: Volendam; 1978: Monarch Sun; 1978-1983: Volendam; 1983-1985: Island Sun; 1985-1987: Liberte; 1987-1988: Canada Star; 1988-1990: Queen of Bermuda; 1990-1995: Enchanted Seas; 1995-2004: Universe Explorer; 2004: Universe
- Operator: Originally, Moore-McCormack
- Port of registry: Panama City, Panama
- Builder: Ingalls Shipbuilding, Pascagoula, Mississippi
- Cost: $24,444,181 ($273 million today)
- Launched: December 16, 1957
- Christened: December 16, 1957
- Completed: 1958
- Acquired: September 4, 1958
- Maiden voyage: September 12, 1958
- Identification: IMO number: 5050567; Callsign:
- Fate: Scrapped in Alang, December 7, 2004

General characteristics
- Tonnage: 14,208 GRT; 5,238 DWT
- Length: 574.5 ft (175.1 m)
- Beam: 88.19 ft (26.9 m)
- Draft: 27.25 ft (8.3 m)
- Installed power: 35,000 SHP
- Propulsion: Twin screw, General Electric DR Geared Turbines
- Speed: 23 knots (43 km/h; 26 mph)
- Capacity: 557 passengers

SS Brasil was an American built ocean liner launched at Ingalls Shipbuilding in Pascagoula, Mississippi in 1957. The ship was originally named Brasil for Moore-McCormack's South American service, but was renamed many times. During its history, the ship served as a cruise ship and later served in the Semester at Sea program as Universe Explorer. In 2004, she was renamed Universe, where the ship departed for Alang, India to get scrapped.

== Design and construction ==
Brasil was a replacement for Moore-McCormack 's SS Brazil (1928). Brasil and her sister ship, Argentina, used MARAD Design P2-S2-9a. Construction was subsidized by the United States Maritime Administration under title V, sections 501 and 504 of the Merchant Marine Act of 1936. At the time of her construction, Brasil was said to be the largest ship built in the "deep south".

Ingalls Shipbuilding had the lowest US bid at $24,444,181 ($273 million today) for each of the two ships. The Maritime administration subsidized the cost of construction by paying $19,528,362 ($218 million today) to support the US shipbuilding industry. Meaning that the ships would have cost nearly $20 million less if they had been built outside the United States. As of 2015, Brasil and Argentina were among the last luxury liners built in the United States.

Design included Denny-Brown stabilizers, a system of retractable fins to stabilize the ships in heavy seas. The ship design originally included a solarium for nude sun tanning inside the false funnel.

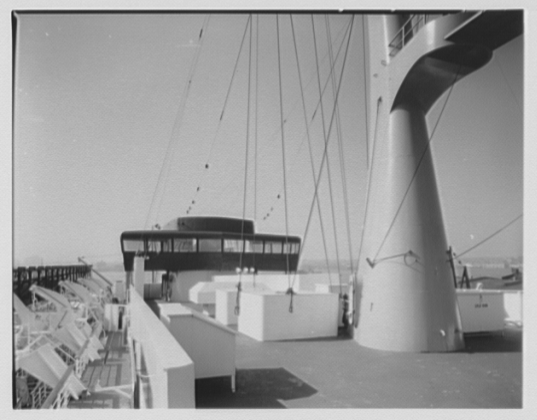
Top Deck with original funnel

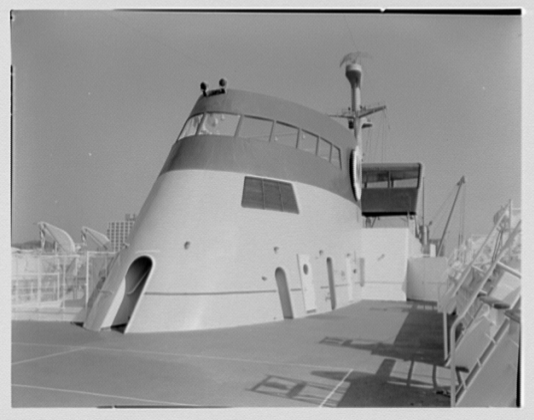
Original faux funnel with solarium

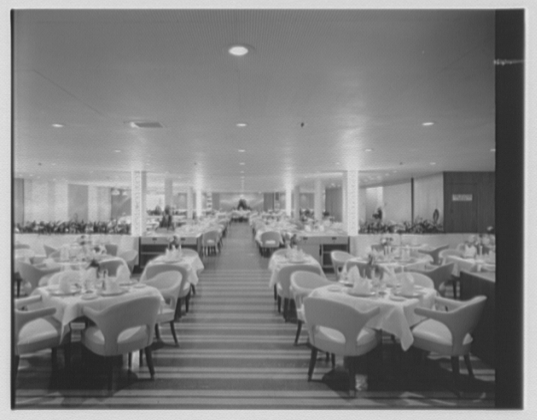
Main dining room

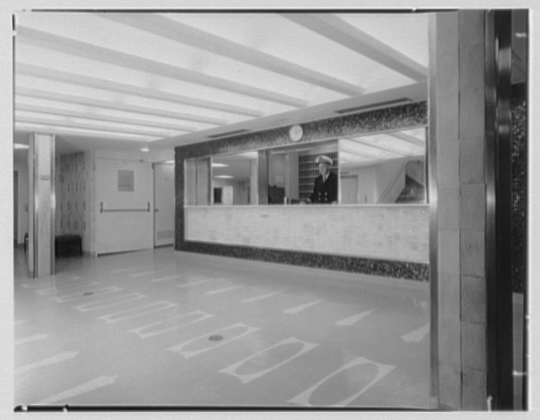
Pursers Office

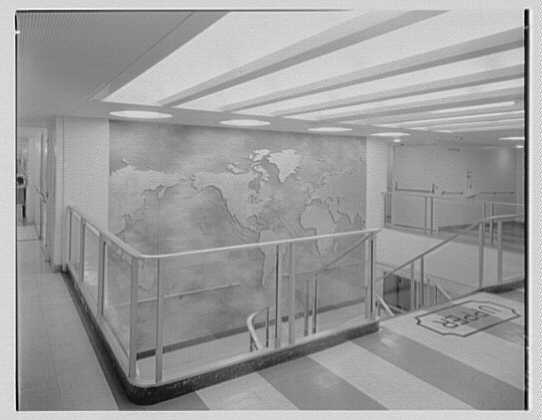
Stair Mural

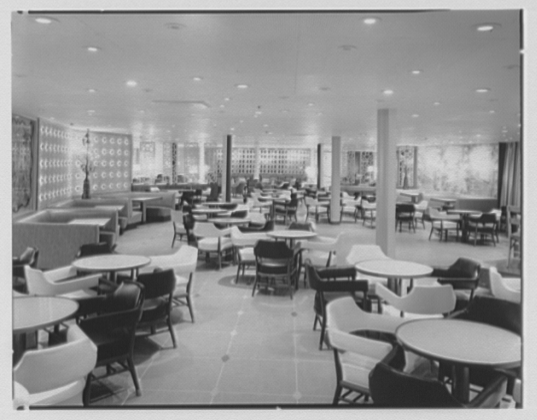
Lounge

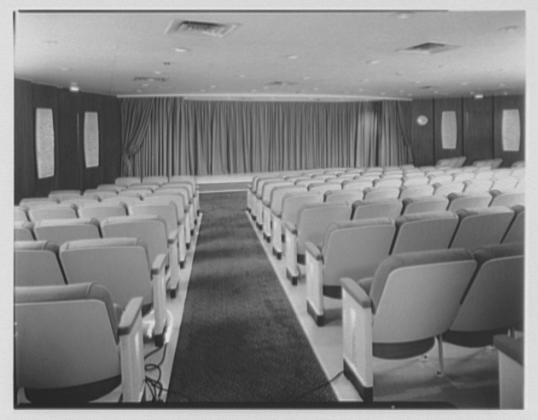
Cinema

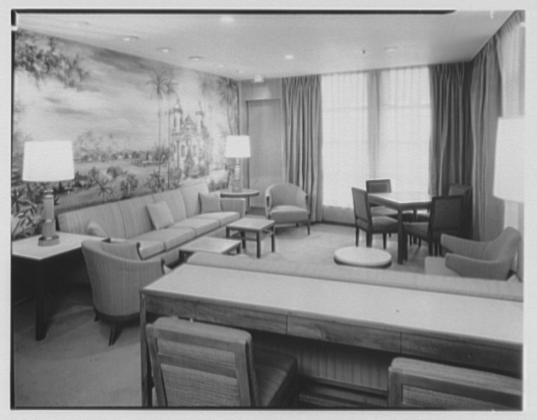
Lounge

== History ==
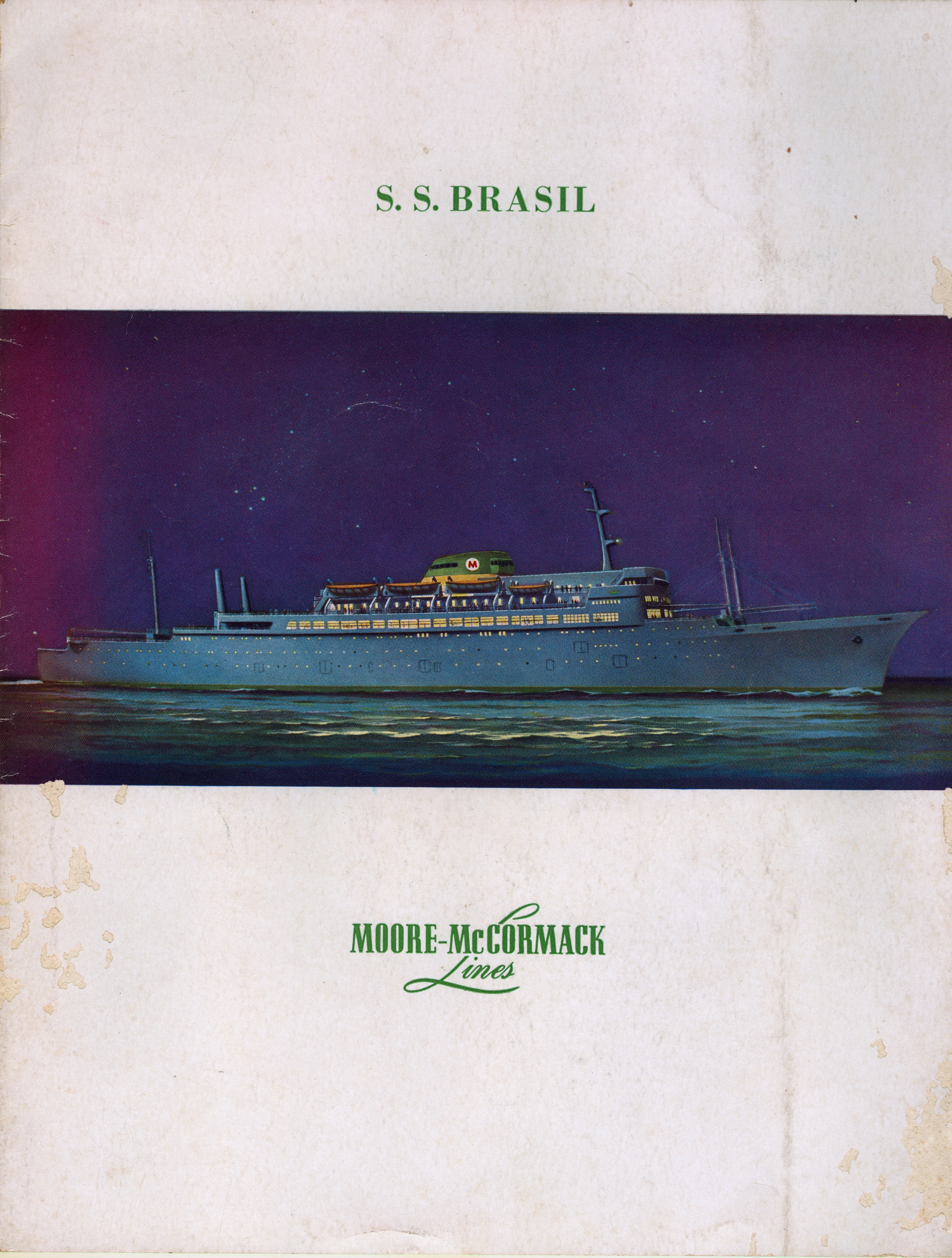
Promotional menu for maiden voyage

=== Moore McCormack Lines ===
Brasil was launched December 16, 1957 and christened by Mrs. Emmet J. McCormack, wife of a Moore-McCormack lines board chairman. The ship was named for Brazil and was spelled with an "s" at the suggestion of the Brazilian Ambassador to follow the Portuguese spelling. Pulitzer prize winning correspondent Hal Boyle was invited to press the button that launched Brasil as the ship was christened. Boyle also sailed on the ship's maiden voyage.

The ship was delivered September 4, 1958 and departed on her maiden voyage September 12, 1958.

In 1969, a Cuban refugee stowed away on Brasil, but was refused entry on arrival to the United States. The refugee was eventually allowed entry after three months, a return trip to Brazil and 16,000 miles traveled on the ship.

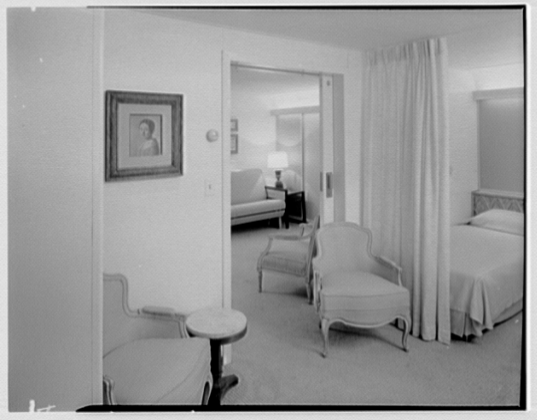
SS Brasil Stateroom 168, November 1958.

=== Holland America Line ===
Brasil and Argentina were sold to Holland America Line in 1972 for a total of $20 million ($154 million today). At that time the ship was flagged under Netherlands Antilles. A law was required to be passed to permit the sale since the ships were subsidized by the Maritime administration. In 1977, Congressman Edward Garmatz was indicted for allegedly taking a bribe from the president of Moore-McCormack in exchange for pushing through the legislation that allowed the sale. However, the charges against Garmatz were dropped in early 1978 just prior to the case going to trial after a key witness had been found to have fabricated documents.

In September 1976, the ship was registered under the Panama flag and chartered to Monarch Cruise Lines, and renamed Monarch Sun. While the ship was named Monarch Sun, it received passengers from sister ship Monarch Star (ex-Argentina) after it suffered an engine failure in January 1977 off the coast of Cuba. The ship was returned to Holland America Line in 1978 and renamed Volendam.

=== American Hawaii Cruises ===
In 1985 Holland America Lines sold the Volendam to American Hawaii Cruises, who renamed her SS "Liberte." A refit saw modification of the faux funnel and new staterooms added by forward extension of the Main deck superstructure. "Liberte" departed on a series of Tahitian Islands cruises in December 1985, she remained with the line until 1987.

=== Bermuda Star Line ===
In 1987 the ship was sold to Bermuda Star Line, who was also operating her former sister as the Bermuda Star. The ship was first named Canada Star, keeping her white livery unlike her blue hulled sister. She sailed to Bermuda from various east coast cities of the United States. Within a year the ship was renamed Queen of Bermuda, much to the ire of Bermuda residents who had a long connection with the more infamous Queen of Bermuda of the former Furness Bermuda Line.

=== Commodore Cruise Line ===
In 1990 she was sold again to Commodore Cruise Line under the name Enchanted Seas and operated weekly cruises based out of New Orleans. In May 1994, it was reported that Enchanted Seas was delayed by 15 hours because the crew discovered a 5 feet (1.5 m) long, 10 inches (25 cm) diameter pipe filled with marijuana attached to the ship underwater. The crew heard banging on the hull and feared damage to the rudder housing so they sent divers to investigate the noise during a visit to the Cayman Islands.

=== Semester at Sea ===
In July 1995, the name was changed to Universe Explorer for use in the Semester at Sea program. The ship had conducted a single semester at sea from February to May 1996 and began a pleasure cruise, not related to the Semester at Sea program, from Vancouver to Alaska on July 23, 1996. On July 27, 1996, after rounding retreat point in the Lynn Canal, Alaska, a fire broke out in the laundry room around 3 AM. 1,006 were aboard at the time of the fire. 5 crew members died, 55 crew members and one passenger were injured and 69 were transported to hospitals. Estimated damage to the ship was $1.5 million. The fire originated in a laundry basket in the laundry room, but the exact cause of the fire could not be determined. The NTSB could not rule out, discarded cigarette smoking materials, spontaneous combustion or a deliberate human act.

In October 2000, Universe Explorer was damaged on the Saigon River in Vietnam during a collision with a container ship. Universe Explorer sustained damage to five cabins and a had 30 feet (9.1 m) long gash in the hull. Over 600 students were on board for the Semester at Sea program.

In 2004 the ship went for a refit in Hong Kong, but after disputes with the ownership and various problems found during inspection, it was decided to sell the ship for scrap.

== Fate ==
The ship was renamed Universe and sailed from Hong Kong under its own power to India for scrapping. The ship was beached at Alang during high tide on December 7, 2004, and was scrapped over the following months.
