= SS Argentina (1958) =

Ocean liner

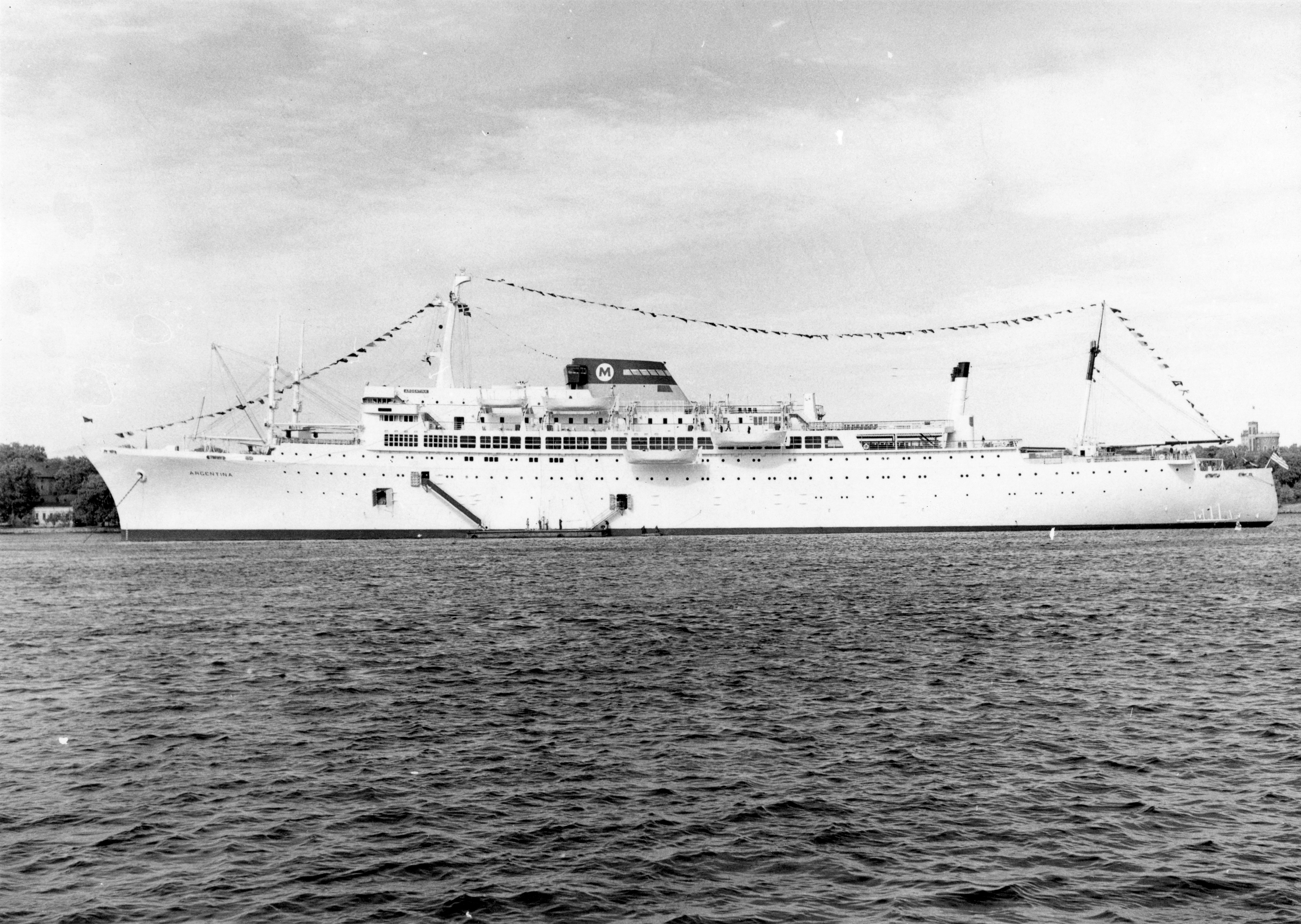
- Argentina, c.1963

History
- Name: Argentina (1958-1972); Veendam (1972-1974) (Note: Owned by Holland America Lines entities and operating as Veendam between 1974 and 1984. Holland America chartered the ship to other lines which operated the ship under different names during the charter.); Brasil (1974-1975); Veendam (1975-1976); Monarch Star (1976-1978); Veendam (1978-1984); Bermuda Star (1984-1990); Enchanted Isle (1990—2003); New Orleans (2003)
- Owner: Moore-McCormack (1958-1972); Holland America Lines (1972—1984) (Note: Ownership was by Holland America Lines corporate entities, first in Willemstad, Netherlands Antilles then in Panama.); Bermuda Star Line (1984-1990); Commodore Cruise Line (1990-2001)
- Operator: Moore-McCormack Lines, Inc. (1958-1972); Holland America Lines (1972—1974); Agencia Maritima Intermares S.A. (1974-1975 charter); Holland America Lines (1975—1976); Monarch Cruise Lines (1976-1978); Holland America Lines (1978-1984); Bermuda Star Line (1984-1990); Commodore Cruise Line (1990-2001)
- Port of registry: New York, United States (1958-1972)
- Ordered: January 17, 1952
- Builder: Ingalls Shipbuilding, Pascagoula, Mississippi
- Cost: $24,444,181 ($273 million today)
- Yard number: 468
- Laid down: October 18, 1956
- Launched: March 12, 1958
- Sponsored by: Mrs. William T. Moore
- Christened: March 12, 1958
- Completed: Delivered: December 9, 1958 at New York
- Maiden voyage: December 12, 1958
- Out of service: December 9, 2003
- Identification: U.S. Official Number: 277850; IMO number: 5023162; Signal: WMDU; Callsign: 3FMG2
- Fate: Scrapped in Alang, India starting December 9, 2003

General characteristics as first registered. (Note: As first registered. Subsequent modifications resulted in significant change to tonnage and capacities.)
- Type: Ocean liner
- Tonnage: 14,984 GRT, 5,744 NRT; 8,748 DWT
- Length: 574.4 ft (175.1 m) (registry)
- Beam: 84 ft (25.6 m)
- Draft: 27.25 ft (8.3 m)
- Depth: 29.7 ft (9.1 m)
- Installed power: 28,000 hp
- Propulsion: Twin screw, General Electric DR Geared Turbines
- Speed: 23 knots (43 km/h; 26 mph)
- Capacity: 557 passengers

SS Argentina was an ocean liner launched at Ingalls Shipbuilding in Pascagoula, Mississippi, United States in 1958. The ship was the last ocean liner to be completed in the United States. Sister ship, Brasil had been launched in December 1957. Both ships operated in Moore-McCormack's South American service serving ports on the east coasts of North and South America.

In 1972 Argentina was sold to Holland America Lines, Willemstad, Netherlands Antilles, and was renamed Veendam, the third of the line's ships to bear the name. Holland America chartered the ship twice during the time its entities owned the ship during which the ship operated under other names. The first was during 1974-1975 when the ship operated as Brasil. The second was a charter during 1976–1978 in which the ship operated as Monarch Star before returning to the name Veendam under a Holland America Line entity in Panama.

Veendam was sold in 1984 and renamed Bermuda Star, operating as such until sale in 1990. The ship last served as a cruise ship for Commodore Cruise Line as Enchanted Isle. After bankruptcy of the line, arrest of the ship for outstanding debts and sale at auction the ship sailed from New Orleans as New Orleans for the final voyage in 2003 to Alang, India, for scrapping.

== Design and construction ==
Argentina was a replacement for Moore-McCormack's SS Argentina (1929). Argentina and her sister ship, Brasil, used MARAD Design P2-S2-9a. Construction was subsidized by the United States Maritime Administration under title V, sections 501 and 504 of the Merchant Marine Act of 1936.

Ingalls Shipbuilding had the lowest US bid at $24,444,181 ($273 million today) for each of the two ships. The Maritime administration subsidized the cost of construction by paying $19,528,362 ($218 million today) to support the US shipbuilding industry. Meaning that the ships would have cost nearly $20 million less if they had been built outside the United States. As of 2015, Brasil and Argentina were the last luxury liners built in the United States.

The design included a large dummy stack for appearance and Denny-Brown stabilizers, a system of retractable fins to stabilize the ships in heavy seas.

The 1962 registry information for Argentina shows the ship with U.S. Official Number 277850, signal WMDU, 14,984 GRT, 5,744 NRT, registry length of 574.4 ft (175.1 m), 84 ft (25.6 m) beam and depth of 29.7 ft (9.1 m), 28,000 horsepower and registry port of New York.

Argentina was launched March 12, 1958 and christened by Mrs. William T. Moore, wife of the Moore-McCormack lines president. Ambassadors of both Argentina and Uruguay were present to speak at the launch. Argentina and Brasil were to operate in the line's service to east coast ports of the United States and South America.

== History ==
=== Moore-McCormack Lines (1958–1972) ===
The ship departed Pascagoula December 1, 1958 under command of the line's Commodore, Thomas N. Simmons who had been captain of Brasil, bound for New York on a combination trial and delivery voyage. Argentina was delivered to the line at Todd Shipyard in New York on December 9, 1958. On December 12, 1958, the ship departed New York on her maiden voyage for Buenos Aires, Argentina. On departure for the return to New York the ship was involved in a minor collision with no injuries with the tanker Atlantic Viscountess in the Río de la Plata.

Between September and December 1963 both Argentina and Brasil underwent overhaul and expansion at Bethlehem Steel Company in Baltimore. Two new passenger decks were added to accommodate 163 passengers in 63 new staterooms. New and expanded public rooms, including a new observation lounge above the bridge, were added for the expanded passenger load.

Charles Reid, captain of Argentina, disappeared from the ship October 30, 1968 while underway about 26 miles east of Cuba in the Windward Passage and was lost at sea. The ship was transiting from Kingston, Jamaica to Hamilton, Bermuda. His death was labelled an "apparent suicide" by Moore-McCormack lines.

In early 1969 the government rejected Moore-McCormack's request to lay up Argentina and Brasil which, despite subsidies, were losing $2.7 million. In early September 1969 the ships were laid up in Baltimore for repairs with length of time unspecified. The ships were described by the line as "white elephants" with crew outnumbering passengers by 3 to 2 without profits. One proposed solution was to have the two ships jointly owned by a new company formed by Moore-McCormack, American Export-Isbrandtsen Lines and United States Lines. With eventual government approval the ships were sold to Holland America Lines in 1972. Completion of the sale to a foreign interest, able to operate the vessels more economically, required Congress to pass an act as the ships had been built with subsidies and had not reached the 20 year economic life as required by law. The ships remained laid up about two more years awaiting that action.

=== Holland America Lines (1972–1984) ===
Holland America Lines, Willemstad, Netherlands Antilles, renamed the ship Veendam following two previous Holland America ships bearing the name. (Note: The first was Veendam (1871) which sank February 1898, followed by SS Veendam (1922). A fourth ship, MS Veendam (1994), operated with the line until July 2020 and was then sold to Greek interests.) The ship was placed on the line's Atlantic service between Rotterdam and New York.

During December 1973 Veendam operated out of Baltimore on cruises, part of a program promoted by the city and the Maryland Port Administration, that were booked at near capacity. In February 1974 the line announced cancellation of scheduled cruises from Baltimore with plans to sell the two former U.S. liners due to high operating costs. The Baltimore cruises, announced on unusually short notice, had apparently been the last effort of the line to keep the ships in operation. Volendam, formerly Brasil, (Note: The two ships had very similar histories troubled by the end of the passenger liner era and attempts to shift to cruising. The ships were designed for luxury, speedy scheduled transportation between ports. Cruising was focused on entertainment aboard for a larger number of passengers with a different purpose for paying fares. General economic difficulties in the larger economy and competition with ships designed for cruising made former liners uneconomic in many respects.) had been laid up in Norfolk, Virginia at the time of the announcement and Veendam would be laid up on arrival from a world cruise. Increased fuel costs, reportedly rising form $20 a ton to more than $94 a ton, already requiring a passenger surcharge of $4 per day and needing $20 per day to break even, along with crew costs and devaluation of the dollar drove the decision. A sale required further Maritime Administration approval due to the conditions Congress imposed in the first sale.

The ship remained in lay up at Hampton Roads, Virginia until chartered by Agencia Maritima Intermares S.A. to operate cruises out of Rio de Janeiro as Brasil for the 1974/75 winter season. After the charter the ship returned to Holland America Lines operation as Veendam until 1976 when the ship was chartered to Monarch Cruise Lines (Note: References differ on whether the Monarch brand was a subsidiary of Holland America or an entity bought by Holland America after showing profitable operation of the ship. By 1975 Holland America was converting to a cruise line, selling its transport division and cargo ships, hiring crews from the Philippines and moving the company from Rotterdam to the United States in 1978.) and renamed to Monarch Star with Panamanian registry. The ship suffered an engine failure in January 1977 off the coast of Cuba forcing 368 passengers to transfer to a sister ship Monarch Sun.

In 1977 Holland America Line, Panama acquires the ship and apparently the Monarch line to rename and operate the ship as Veendam for cruises in Alaskan waters until 1981. The ship was chartered by Westours of Seattle, which the line had purchased interest and operating as Holland America Line-Westours Inc., which sold the passages and operated the tours. While operating in Alaska during 1979 the ship hit a reef but suffered only repairable damage. In 1981 the ship, with new cabins created in #3 hold, begins cruises to Bermuda. In 1982 the ship's registry is moved from Panama to Holland America Cruises Inc. of Willemstad.

=== Bahama Cruise Line/Bermuda Star Line (1984–1990) ===
In 1983 the ship was sold and placed in operation under management of the Bahama Cruise Line with registry in Panama. Summer cruising was from New York to Bermuda with winter cruises from Miami to Mexico. In 1987 the parent company, registered in Panama, and the operating line are renamed with the operating company becoming the Bermuda Star Line. The Bermuda Star Line was a Cayman Island company with all its ships registered in Panama but did almost all its business in the United States and had its corporate offices in New York City or Teaneck, New Jersey. (Note: Owning companies and operators are often confusing corporate entities even with individual ships being owned by separate companies (sometimes named for the ship) but operating as a "fleet" under separate "line" entities that may or may not have clear links to owning companies. Flag countries are even more vague. In the cited court cases a judge noted the ships "have no other connections to Panama. It does not appear that any of the (company's) major stockholders are Panamanians ... nor does it appear that the (company's ships) ever visited Panama" and have no connection other than "flying the Panamanian flag." That is the entire idea of "flags of convenience.")

The line operated cruises in various locations with even the two old Moore-McCormack ships swapping names briefly in 1988 for a period to maintain name recognition in the Bermuda cruises. The line had been the first to accept a charter by RSVP Vacations for an all gay cruise. The first was successful and a second aboard Bermuda Star, with the ship nicknamed "Brenda Starr" by passengers had sailed from New Orleans in February 1987. At the start of the next year the ship was operating winter cruises out of San Diego to Mexico.

Bermuda Star was undergoing a $25 million ($64.9 million today) overhaul by Southwest Marine, Inc at the Port of Portland, Oregon in December 1989 when a fire broke out on board. The fire resulted in a five alarm response and five of the crew went to a local hospital for treatment of smoke inhalation. The fire started on the promenade deck and was started by a cutting torch. Damage was estimated at $2 million ($5.19 million today).

The ship ran aground during poor visibility in June 1990 in Buzzards Bay, five miles from Woods Hole, Massachusetts, sustaining a 90 ft (27.4 m) long tear in the hull, 2 ft (0.6 m) wide near the fuel tanks. Over a thousand passengers were evacuated and about 7,500 U.S. gallons (28,000 L) of number 6 fuel oil was spilled. The ship was to be towed to a drydock in New York for repairs. The incident occurred in the days following the June 8, 1990 Mega Borg Oil Spill in the Gulf of Mexico and the story was paired with the Mega Borg story in news media.

The company, including the entity Bahama Cruise Line, and the ship had been involved in legal cases with judgements having effect on the cruise industry. The ship itself, as customary in maritime cases, was "defendant" in a personal injury case with the wording "BAHAMA CRUISE LINE, INCORPORATED, Bermuda Star Line, Incorporated, and S.S. BERMUDA STAR, her engines, boilers, tackle, appurtenances, etc., Defendants." which the line lost on appeal. A case involving the Equal Employment Opportunity Commission's jurisdiction over foreign flagged ships and offshore companies ruled that such ships operating primarily in the United States were subject to U.S. law in a ruling with major significance for the industry.

The Bermuda Star Line, with three vessels, was deemed too small to compete with the larger companies and in spring of 1989 was acquired by the parent company of Commodore Cruise Line, Effjohn International. That company, formed in 1989 by the Swedish Johnson Line and the Finland Steamship Company, was one of the larger operators of passenger ships. In contrast Bermuda Star Line had lost about $4 million and its shares had dropped from an initial $6.50 per share to about $2 per share. The line, despite a loyal following, had been unable to distinguish itself in the competitive cruise industry. The three ships involved in the sale were Bermuda Star, sister ship Brasil at the time named Queen of Bermuda and Veracruz (Note: Built as Theodor Herzl then Carnivale, Freeport, Veracruz, Sun Ambassador and lastly Fiesta which caught fire, listed and sank at a shipyard in 1991 while being refurbished.) built in 1957. The ships were expected to be merged into the Commodore line's fleet.

=== Commodore Cruise Line (1990–2001) ===
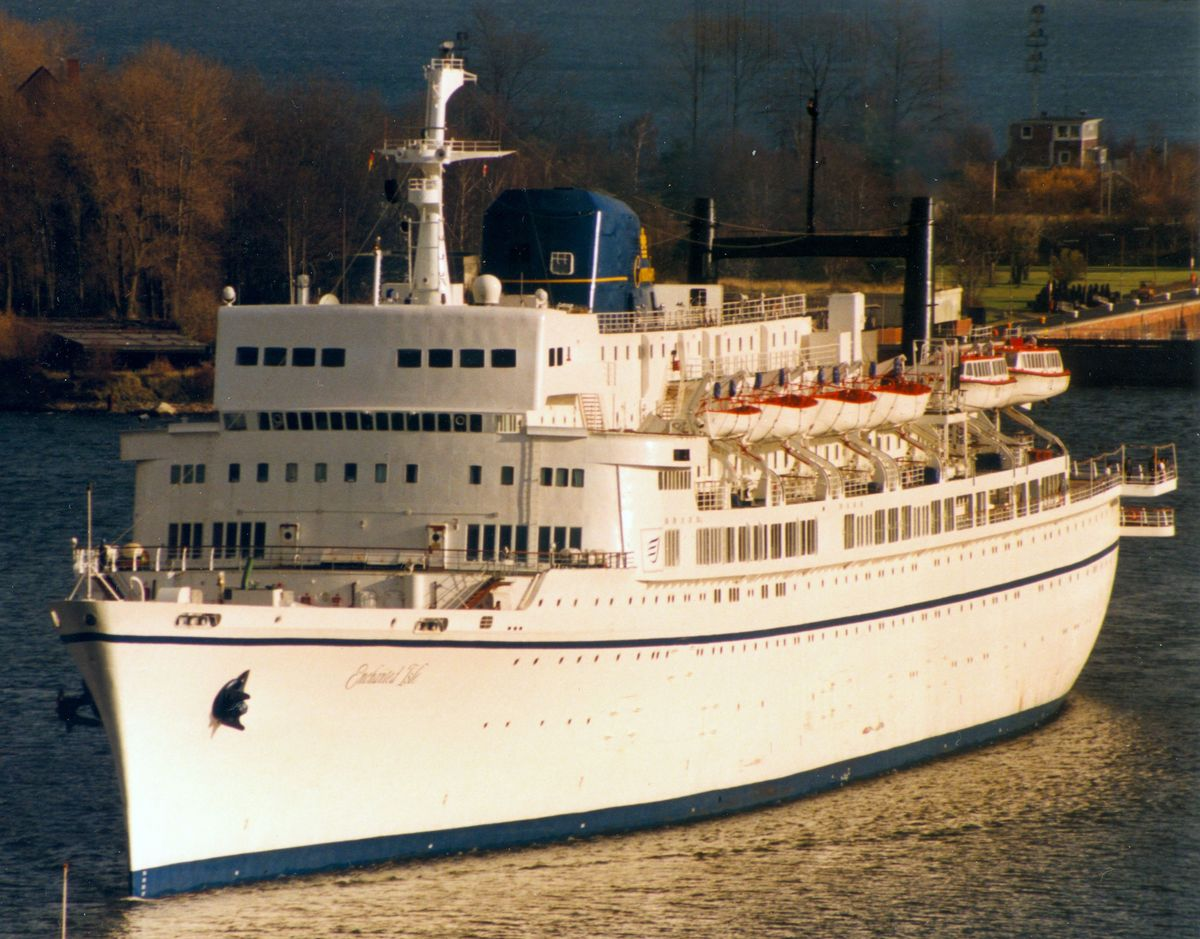
Enchanted Isle as seen in Kiel, 1994.

The Commodore line had operated one ship and not been well known in the U.S. cruise industry while the Bermuda Star Line brand was known as a minor cruise fleet operator. Effjohn had originally stated they would operate the fleets independently, despite both being "too small" to be successful, but decided to merge the newly acquired ships into the Commodore brand for a new start in the U.S. trade as a four ship line. Bermuda Star was renamed Enchanted Isle. The ship departed San Diego in April 1993 for a final cruise to Miami then sails empty to Saint Petersburg, Russia making cruises in the Baltic before becoming a floating hotel in Saint Petersburg in 1994.

To serve as a hotel the ship's electrical system was converted to the 220 volt European system serving its 375 rooms. In August 1994 the ship moved to Bremerhaven to serve as quarters for British workmen refitting Queen Elizabeth 2. The ship then returned to cruising based in the Caribbean during which it suffered a blackout requiring towing to San Juan, Puerto Rico. In February 1995 the ship resumed cruising out of Bridgetown, Barbados. On 30 December 2000 the line suspended all operations due to bankruptcy and the ship was arrested on behalf of the crew for pay and outstanding fines. Further, the ship had outstanding payments for its purchase. It was laid up at Violet, Louisiana and sold at auction 6 December 2001 in New Orleans. Effjohn bought the ship back with plans for new operations but those plans did not materialize.

The ship was renamed New Orleans and sailed under its own power to India for scrapping. The ship was beached at Alang during high tide on December 9, 2003, and was scrapped over the following months.
