= Akademik Sergey Vavilov =

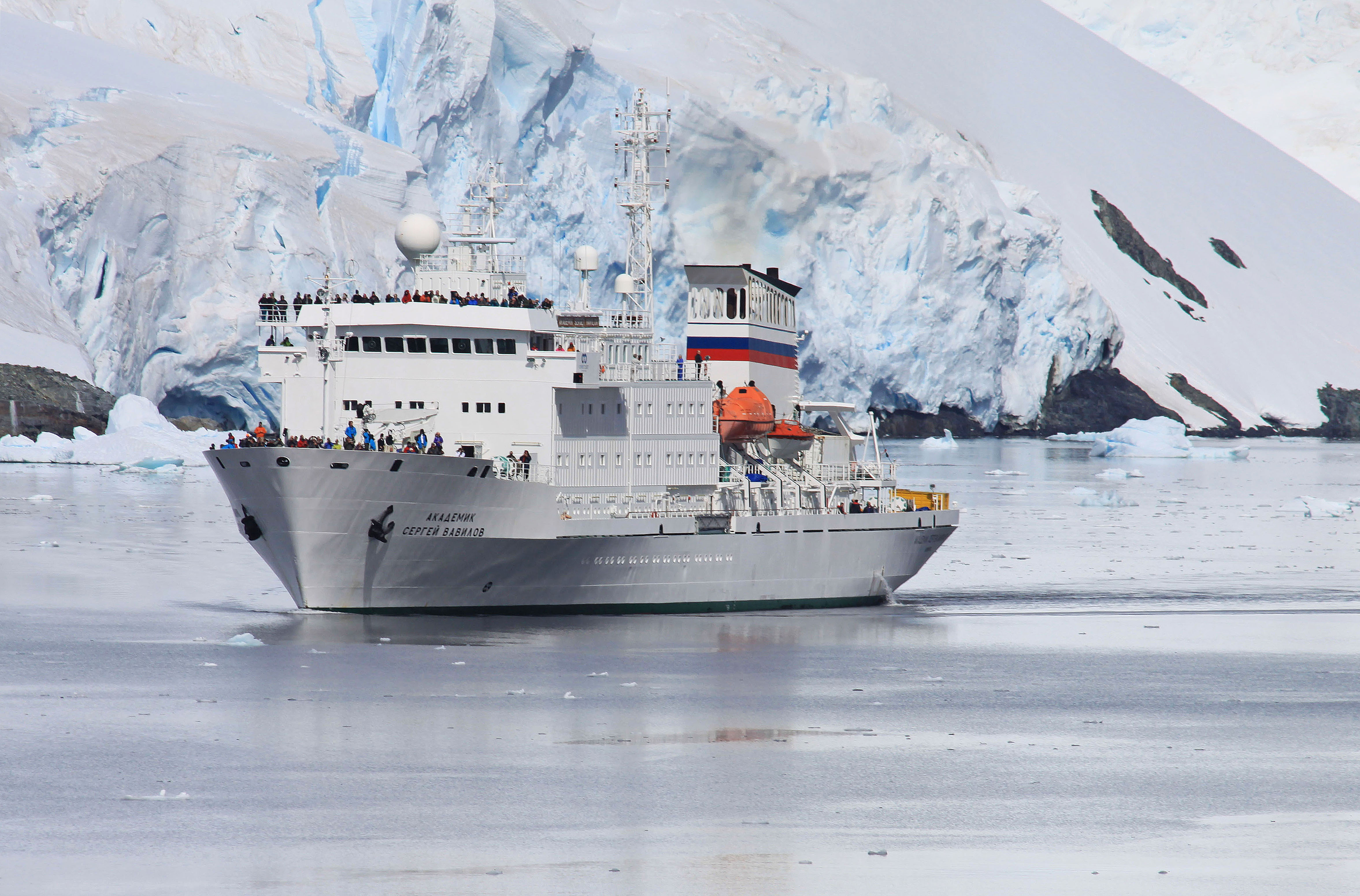
- Akademik Sergey Vavilov in the Lemaire Channel (2006)

History

Russia
- Name: Akademik Sergey Vavilov
- Namesake: Sergey Ivanovich Vavilov
- Operator: Shirshov Institute
- Port of registry: 1988–1992: Kaliningrad, Soviet Union; 1992 onwards: Kaliningrad, Russia
- Builder: Hollming, Rauma
- Yard number: 265
- Laid down: 18 August 1986
- Launched: 16 December 1986
- Completed: 12 February 1988
- Identification: IMO number: 8507729; MMSI number: 273414400; Callsign: UAUO
- Status: In service

General characteristics
- Tonnage: 6,344 GT; 1,903 NT; 2,048 DWT
- Length: 117.17 m (384 ft 5 in)
- Beam: 18.22 m (59 ft 9 in)
- Draft: 5.90 m (19 ft 4 in)
- Installed power: 2 × 6CHN 40/46 (2 × 2,576 kW)
- Propulsion: Two shafts; controllable pitch propellers; Wärtsilä 600 kW bow and stern thrusters
- Speed: 16.0 knots (29.6 km/h; 18.4 mph)
- Capacity: 80 passengers
- Crew: 53

Akademik Sergey Vavilov (Russian: Академик Сергей Вавилов) is a Russian (formerly Soviet) research vessel, named after physicist Sergey Vavilov. She was completed on 12 February 1988, at the Hollming Yard in Rauma, Finland for the Soviet Union. Akademik Sergey Vavilov started operations as a research vessel of Shirshov Institute of Oceanology of the USSR Academy of Science (Russian Academy of Science since 1991) in the USSR on 20 March 1989, and prior to 7 November 1999, completed five research cruises into Norwegian Sea, North Atlantic Ocean and South Atlantic Ocean.

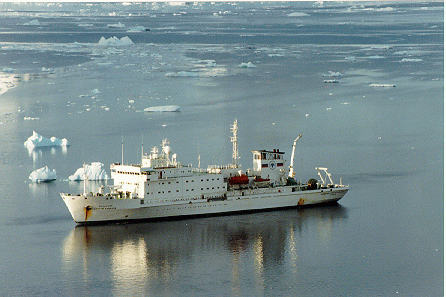
Akademik Sergey Vavilov, Antarctic Peninsula, 1996

Since at least 1996, she has served as cruise ship specializing in polar cruises. She is managed by International Shipping Partners and her current port of registry is Kaliningrad, Russia.

She has a sister ship, Akademik Ioffe, completed at Hollming in 1989. Both ships were chartered by One Ocean Expeditions until 2019.
