= La Belle Des Oceans =

Small, yacht-type cruise ship

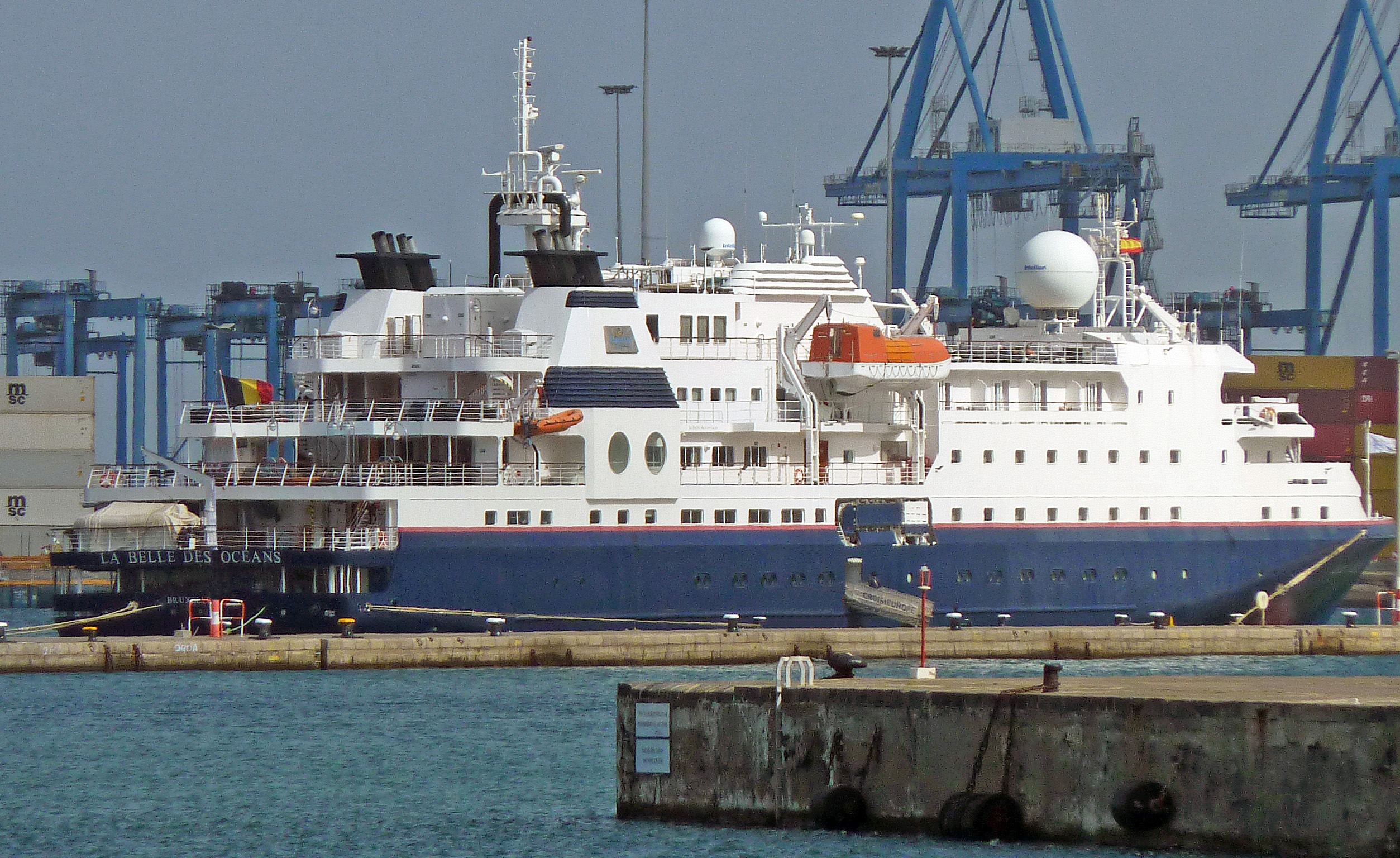
- La Belle Des Oceans docked at Las Palmas, Spain, on 5 March 2026

History
- Name: 1989–1997: Oceanic Grace; 1997–1999: Oceanic Odyssey; 1999–2013: Clipper Odyssey; 2013–2019: Silver Discoverer; 2019-: La Belle Des Oceans
- Owner: 1999–2007: Clipper Cruise Line; 2007–2014: International Shipping Partners; 2014–2019: SunStone Ships; 2019-: CroisiEurope
- Operator: 1999–2007: Clipper Cruise Line; 2007–2014: International Shipping Partners; 2014–2019: Silversea Cruises; 2019-: CroisiEurope
- Port of registry: 1989–2019: Nassau, Bahamas; 2019 onwards: Brussels, Belgium
- Builder: NKK Tsu Works - Tsu, Japan
- Yard number: 112
- Laid down: 22 August 1988
- Launched: 31 October 1988
- Completed: April 1989
- Identification: Call sign: ONKI; IMO number: 8800195; MMSI number: 205788000
- Status: In service

General characteristics
- Tonnage: 5,218 GT
- Length: 102.97 m (337.8 ft)
- Beam: 15.42 m (50.6 ft)
- Draught: 4.13 m (13.5 ft)
- Decks: 7
- Capacity: 130 passengers
- Crew: 73

La Belle Des Oceans is a small, yacht-type cruise ship operated by CroisiEurope. She has previously been operated by a number of cruise lines under different names, the most recent of which was Silver Discoverer.

== Architecture and equipment ==
The ship has a gross tonnage of 5,218, is 338 feet long and 51 feet wide. She is for destination-intensive cruising and does not have many amenities like larger ships.

All the cabins are outside and the ship has a small selection of balcony rooms and has one suite. She can accommodate up to 130 passengers in five categories.

The facilities on board include a jogging track, a swimming pool; a gym and beauty salon; a restaurant and pool grill; a lecture room for in-depth stories and briefings about the destinations and a panoramic lounge. Silver Discoverer is also equipped with 12 Zodiac boats and a glass-bottom boat for exploration of marine life. She used to have a decompression chamber for divers, but it is no longer in use.

== Service history ==
The ship was built in 1989 for the Japanese market as Oceanic Grace, before being bought by Indonesia's Spice Islands Cruises which renamed her Oceanic Odyssey. In 1999, she was bought by St Louis-based Clipper Cruise Line, and renamed Clipper Odyssey. She was then sold in 2007 to International Shipping Partners.

On 10 September 2013, it was announced that the vessel had been purchased by Silversea Cruises. She entered service for Silversea on 1 March 2014, after being rechristened in Singapore by Elda Turco Bulgherini. The following month, she commenced a program of short cruises along the Kimberley coastline between Broome and Darwin, Australia.

As Silver Discoverer, she is deployed in remote regions of the world including Micronesia, Melanesia, Polynesia, the Russian Far East, Southeast Asia, New Zealand and Australia, including the Kimberley. The Silversea Expeditions onboard team consists of 11 experts, from expedition leaders, divemasters and marine biologists to historians, geologists and naturalists.

In 2019, Silver Discoverer left the Silversea Expeditions fleet. The vessel's owners, Florida-based SunStone Ships, subsequently announced it had been sold to the French cruise company CroisiEurope, the transaction having been brokered by Aminima Shipbrokers, and will sail under the name La Belle Des Oceans.

Since 2021, La Belle des Océans has been sailing through the heart of six islands of the Canary archipelago during the winter season and around Corsica during the summer season. Throughout the year, the ship also operates repositioning cruises, calling at destinations in Morocco, Spain and France.

== Incidents ==
In July 2002, the ship ran aground on St. Matthew Island in the Bering Sea but was not damaged. In August 2004, the ship ran aground in the Aleutian Islands near Dutch Harbor and the passengers and crew had to be evacuated. The ship was seriously damaged and 5000 gallons of fuel leaked from the vessel. She returned to service two months later.
