= MS Enchanted Capri =

1975 Belorussiya-class cruise ship

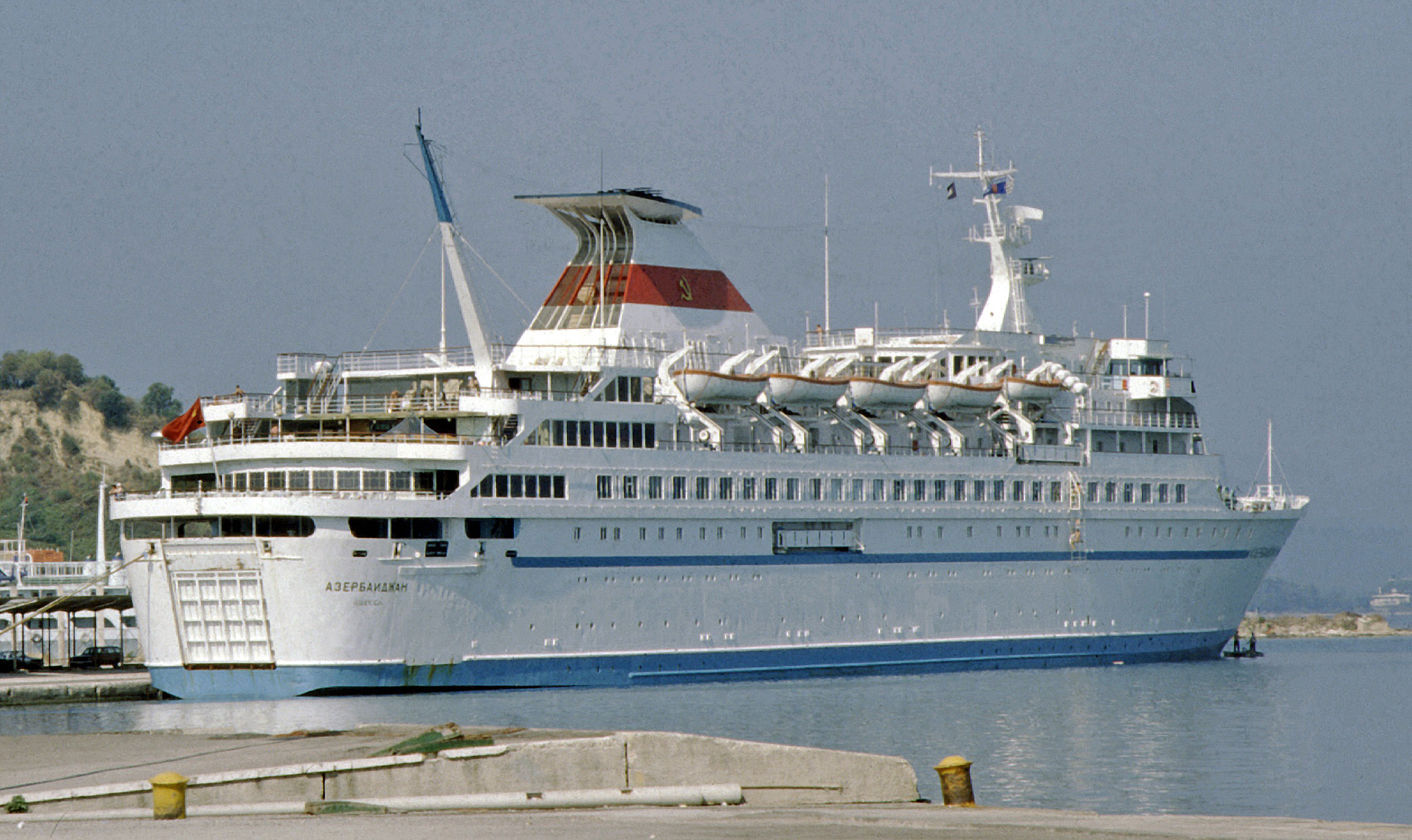
- Azerbaidjan in Corfu, September 1981

History
- Name: Enchanted Capri: 1998–2020; Island Holiday: 1997–1998; Arkadia (Arkadiya): 1996–1997; Azerbaydzhan: 1975–1996
- Owner: Demar Instaladora y Constructora, S.A. de C.V.: 2007–2020; FLOTEL SERVICES SA: 2008; Faraglioni Ltd.: 2003–2008; Commodore Holding Ltd.: 1998–2003; SeaEscape: 1997–1998; BLASCO: 1996–1997; Black Sea Shipping Company: 1975–1996
- Operator: Demar Instaladora y Constructora, S.A. de C.V.: 2007–2020; International Shipping Partners: 2005–2007; Commodore Cruise Line: 1998–2003
- Port of registry: Ciudad del Carmen Campeche, Mexico
- Builder: Wärtsilä Turku Shipyard, Turku, Finland
- Laid down: 1974
- Launched: 14 April 1975
- Completed: 1976
- In service: 1976
- Out of service: 2020
- Identification: Call sign XCJP7; IMO number: 7359474; MMSI number: 345070213
- Fate: grounded in Alvarado in 2020

General characteristics (currently)
- Class & type: Hotel ship
- Tonnage: 15,410 GT, 3,000 DWT, 6,401 NT
- Displacement: 11,319 tons
- Length: 157 m (515 ft 1 in)
- Beam: 21.83 m (71 ft 7 in)
- Draught: 6.2 m (20 ft 4 in)
- Depth: 72 feet
- Installed power: 2 × Wärtsilä - S.E.M.T. Pielstick 18 PC 2-2V, 2 × 9,000 bhp (6,700 kW)
- Propulsion: 2 × Kamewa CPP W/4 blades
- Speed: 20 knots (37 km/h; 23 mph)
- Capacity: 937 passengers
- Crew: 155
- Notes: 248 rooms

MS Enchanted Capri is a wrecked Belorussiya-class cruise ship owned by Demar Instaladora y Constructora, Mexico and operated as an accommodation vessel for oil rigs in the Gulf of Mexico. She was built in 1975 at Wärtsilä Turku Shipyard in Turku, Finland as the 15,409 GRT MS Azerbaydzhan for the Soviet Union-based Black Sea Shipping Company. She had also sailed under the names MS Arkadia and MS Island Holiday.

== History ==
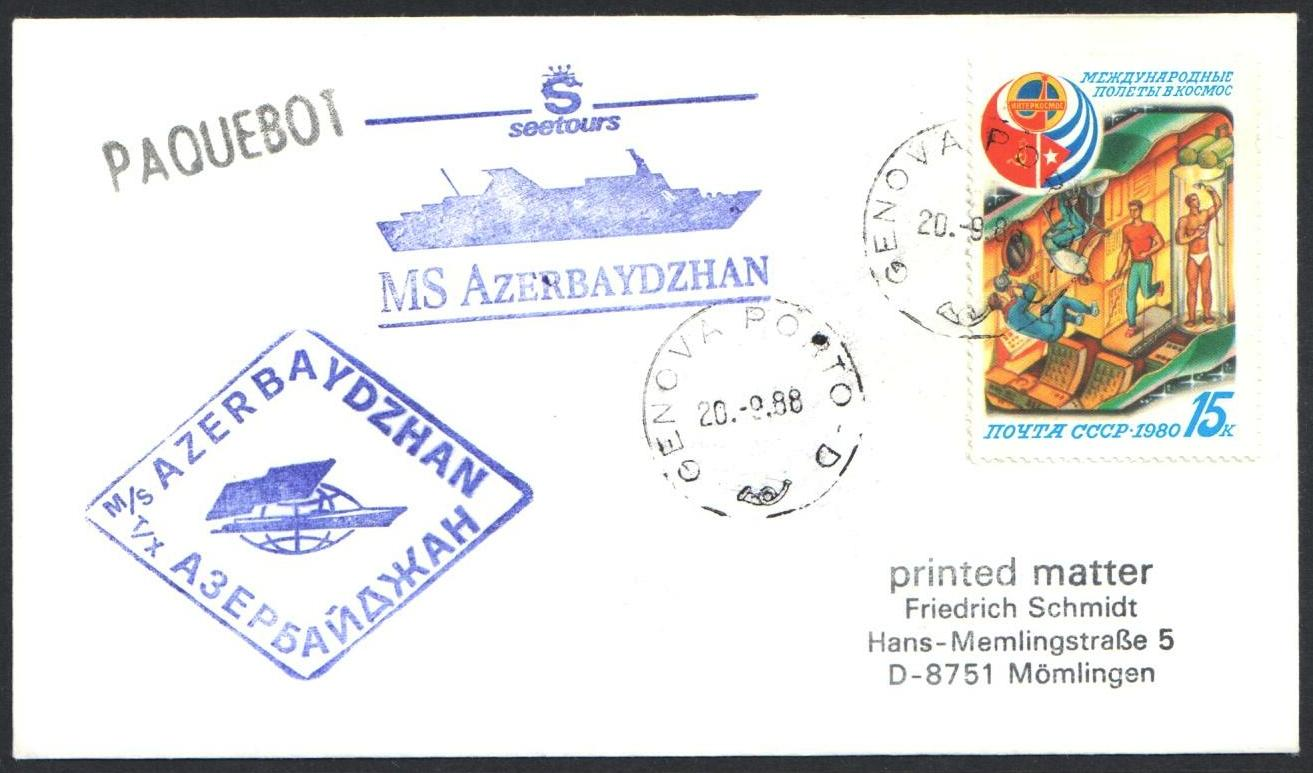
Post of the ship

The Azerbaydzhan was built in 1975 as the third ship of the five Belorussiya class passenger ships ordered by the Soviet Union from the Wärtsilä shipyard in Turku, Finland. She underwent refurbishments in 1984 in Bremerhaven, Germany and in 1997 in Freeport, Grand Bahama. In 1996, the vessel was acquired by BLASCO, Ukraine and renamed Arkadia (Arkadiya).

The ship was chartered by SeaEscape, Florida and renamed Island Holiday.

On June 4, 1998, Commodore Cruise Line chartered the vessel, renamed her Enchanted Capri and started 2 and 5-day cruises from New Orleans, Louisiana with an emphasis on gaming. With 248 cabins, including eight suites, and eight passenger decks, the Enchanted Capri offered full cruise amenities such as swimming pools, restaurants, gift shops, bars, lounges, theater, disco, gym, sauna, beauty salon, and complete hospital facilities. Commodore Holdings Limited, the parent company to Commodore Cruise Line, and Casino America, Inc. announced that they had executed a definitive agreement under which Casino America would manage the casino operations aboard this ship. The onboard casino, with slots and a variety of table games, was under the Isle of Capri Casinos banner. Following Commodore's bankruptcy on January 11, 2001, the Enchanted Capri made news when the ship was arrested in New Orleans by the International Transport Workers' Federation on behalf of the crew, who were owed $500,000 in back wages. More than 230 crew stranded on the passenger vessel were sent home to forty countries in the biggest repatriation operation staged by the ITWF.

The Enchanted Capri was laid up, her owners chartered her to the Mexican company Demar Instaladora y Constructora in 2003 and refurbished the vessel in 2005 to bring her up to the latest SOLAS standards. At the end of 2007 Enchanted Capri was totally owned by the Mexican company Demar Instaladora y Constructora.

In 2020, it was planned to scrap her in Coatzacoalcos. However, she grounded in Alvarado after dragging anchor in a storm. The vessel was abandoned and still aground as of December 2021.
