= MS Formosa Queen =

Cruise ship

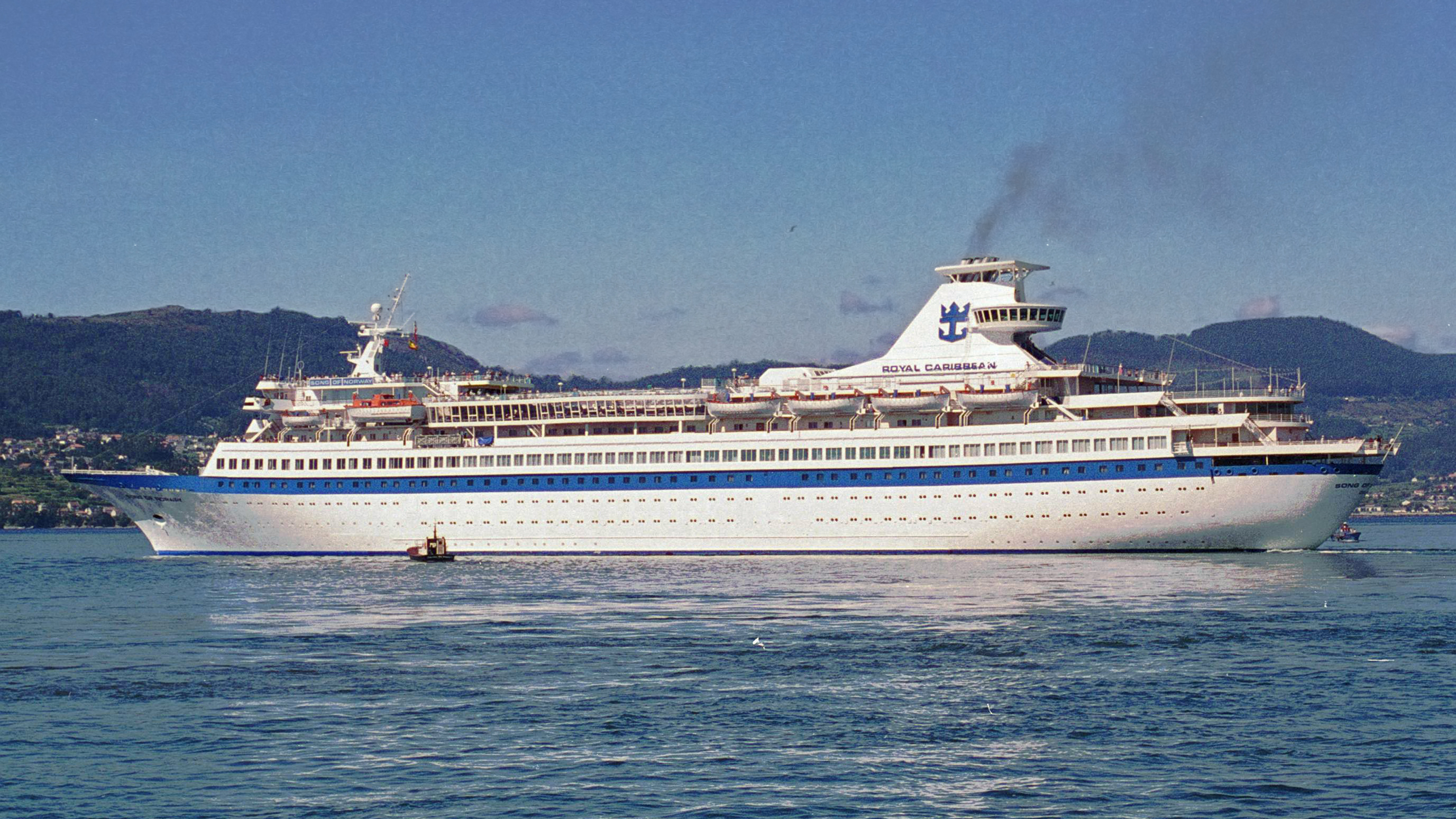
- Song of Norway leaving Vigo, September 1994.

History
- Name: 1970–1997: Song of Norway; 1997–2004: Sundream; 2004–2006: Dream Princess; 2006–2007: Dream; 2007–2008: Clipper Pearl; 2008–2009: Clipper Pacific; 2009–2010: Festival; 2010–2011: Ocean Pearl; 2012–2013: Formosa Queen
- Owner: 1970–1997: Royal Caribbean Cruise Lines; 1997–2004: Airtours Sun Cruises; 2004–2006: Tumaco Navigation; 2006–2007: Lance Shipping; 2007–2009: Pearl Owner Ltd.; 2009–2012: International Shipping Partners; 2012–2013: Formosa Queen Corp.
- Operator: 1970–1997: Royal Caribbean Cruise Lines; 1997–2004: Airtours Sun Cruises; 2004–2007: Caspi Cruises; 2008: Peace Boat; 2009: Caspi Cruises; 2010–2011: Quail Travel Group; 2012–2013: Asia Star Cruises
- Port of registry: 1970–1997: Oslo, Norway; 1997–2004: Nassau, Bahamas; 2004–2006: Limassol, Cyprus; 2006–2009: Nassau, Bahamas; 2009–2012: Majuro, Marshall Islands; 2012–2013: Panama, Panama
- Builder: Wärtsilä Helsinki Shipyard, Finland
- Yard number: 392
- Launched: 2 December 1969
- Completed: 1970
- Acquired: 5 October 1970
- In service: 7 November 1970
- Out of service: 2013
- Identification: Call sign: 3FLU9; IMO number: 7005190; MMSI number: 538003398 → 373524000
- Fate: Scrapped in 2013.

General characteristics (as built)
- Type: Cruise ship
- Tonnage: 18,416 GT; 3,202 DWT
- Length: 168.32 m (552.23 ft)
- Beam: 23.96 m (78.61 ft)
- Draught: 6.70 m (21.98 ft)
- Installed power: Four 9-cylinder Sulzer-Wärtsilä diesel engines, 14,560 kW (combined)
- Speed: 20.5 knots (38.0 km/h; 23.6 mph)
- Capacity: 724 passengers

General characteristics (as of 2013)
- Type: Cruise ship
- Tonnage: 22,945 GT; 4,525 DWT
- Length: 194.32 m (637.53 ft)
- Beam: 24.00 m (78.74 ft)
- Capacity: 1,196 passengers
- Crew: 423
- Notes: Otherwise same as built

MS Song of Norway (later Sundream, Dream Princess, Dream, Clipper Pearl, Clipper Pacific, Festival, Ocean Pearl, Formosa Queen) was one of the first ships purpose-built as a cruise ship. She was the first ship of Royal Caribbean International when she entered operation in 1970. She was sold for scrap in 2013 and broken up in 2014, after serving her last years as a gambling ship.

== Statistics ==
The vessel originally had a gross tonnage of 18,000 tons, and could carry 724 passengers. Following the 1978 refit, she was lengthened by 85 feet, to provide for 1024 passengers and increasing her size to 23,000 gross tons.

== History ==
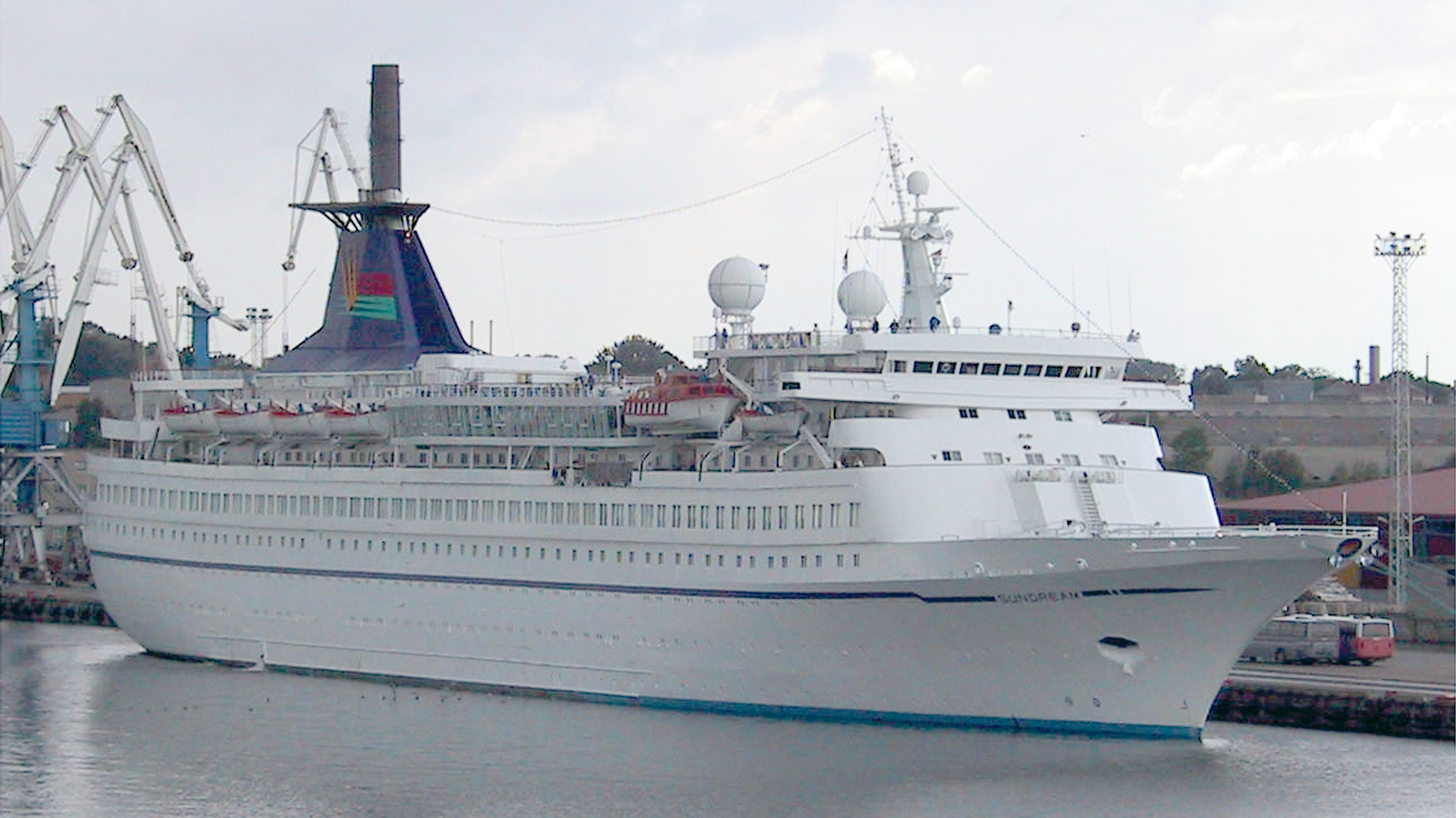
Sundream in Tallinn Harbour, 2001

The vessel was constructed in Helsinki, Finland in 1970. Named Song of Norway, she was the first ship built for cruise line Royal Caribbean International. The vessel was lengthened in 1978, due to the high demand for cruising, and sailed on seven- and fourteen-day cruises out of Miami. As Song of Norway she was the first vessel to service the Royal Caribbean proprietary resort of Labadee, Haiti.

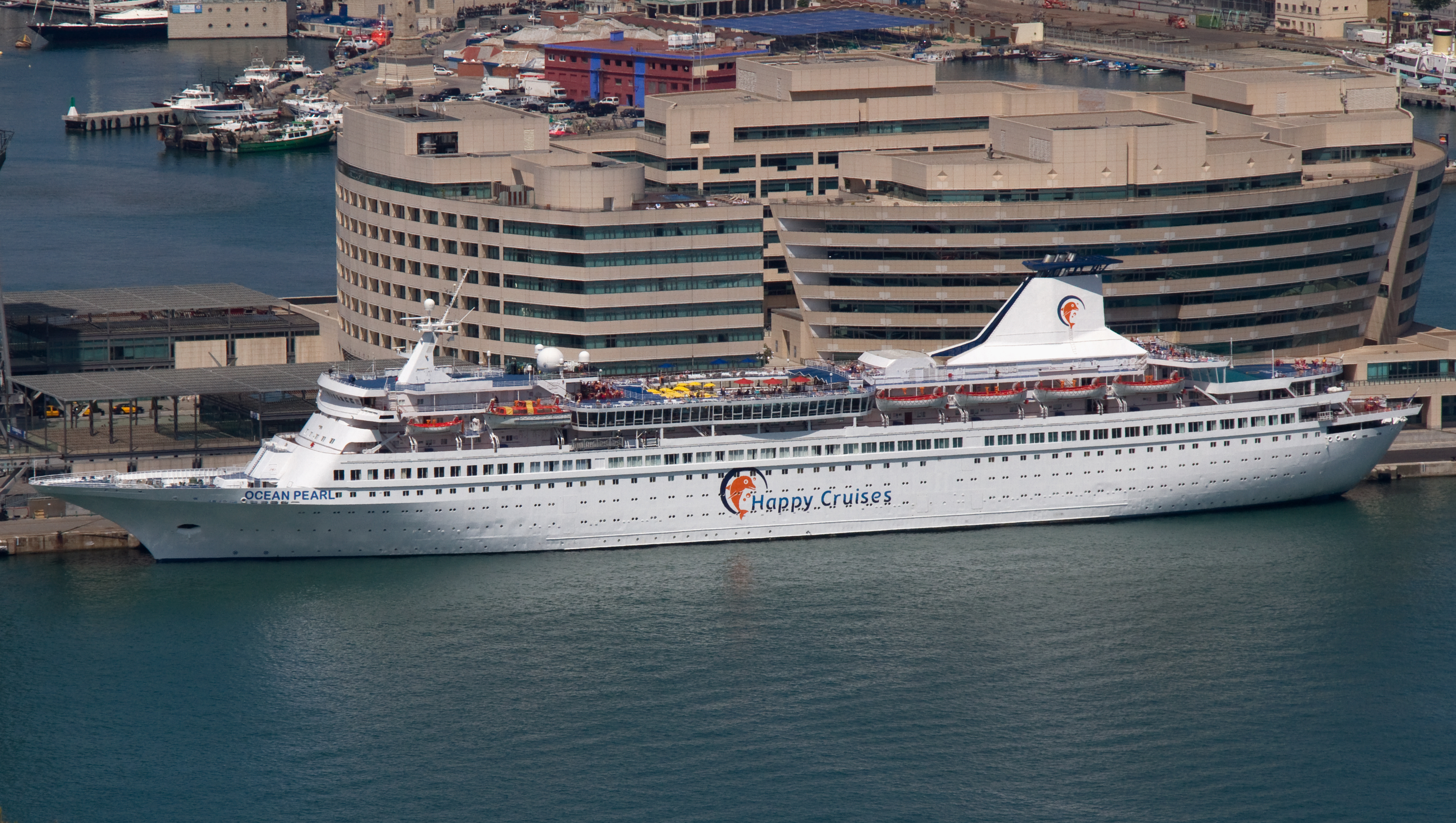
Ocean Pearl

In 1996, surpassed by the significantly larger ships in the Royal Caribbean International fleet, the ship was sold to Sun Cruises, part of the Airtours/MyTravel (which has now merged with Thomas Cook AG), who operated the vessel under the name Sundream. Before the ship entered service for her new owners, the sky lounge around her funnel was removed.

In October 2004 she was sold, refitted and became MS Dream Princess for Caspi Cruises (Israel) and operated the 2005 season from Haifa.

In November 2007 the ship was sold to Pearl Owner Ltd., a company in the Bahamas-based Clipper Group of Denmark, which put the management of the ship in the hands the Miami, Florida based company International Shipping Partners, Inc. (ISP). After refitting in Turkey and Malta, the ship was chartered to the Peace Boat organization and renamed the Clipper Pacific. The ship was in service touring the world, from Japan to Japan, as part of Peace Boat's mission. After numerous repeated problems with the ship, however, the world tour was broken off in Piraeus, Greece. Afterwards, the ship was sold to ISP and renamed to Festival. She came into service again as a cruise ship, first in 2009 for Caspi Cruises and as of 2010 for Quail Travel's Happy Cruises. Quail Travel renewed the charter for the 2011 season. The charter ended when Happy Cruises ceased operations.

In 2009 she was used on Mediterranean voyages, under the name Festival, as a stand in by the Israeli company Caspi Cruises, whose own advertised voyages on smaller vessels had booked to overcapacity. For the 2010 and 2011 seasons, under the name M/V Ocean Pearl, the ship has been chartered by Quail Travel's Happy Cruises. The Ocean Pearl was on a cruise but had to terminate it in Málaga, Spain due to Happy Cruises ceasing operations on September 24, 2011.

=== 2005 refitting ===
In early 2005 Sundream was being refitted in Piraeus under the name Dream Princess. The ship was sailing on four-night cruises from Haifa to Alanya, Rhodes and Larnaca. Some itineraries also included Marmaris and Santorini. In January 2006 the vessel was used to house students from Tulane University after Hurricane Katrina hit New Orleans.

=== September 2007 listing ===
On September 18, 2007, while anchored in the port of Rhodes, the cruise ship developed a 10 degree list. She was immediately evacuated and four officers who were on duty at the time of the incident were detained. The crew was accused of deliberately grounding the vessel to prevent further listing and an ultimate sinking. Divers investigating the incident discovered that hatchways in the hull, designed for discharging untreated waste into the ocean, had been crudely plugged with chunks of wood, to prevent the discharge. That kept the waste on board. Failure to pump the waste in a timely manner resulted in the listing of the vessel.

The list was eventually corrected but on 18 November 2007, due to strong winds, Dream Princess came loose of her moorings and collided with an adjacent cargo ship causing minor damages in both vessels. The coast guard managed to tow the cruise ship back to the dock using tug-boats.

Dream Princess remained in the port of Rhodes for nearly two months until her seaworthiness was re-established. On November 28, 2007, she was towed to the port of Kuşadası.

=== 2008 problems ===
On July 16, 2008, the Clipper Pacific was detained in New York by the United States Coast Guard for numerous safety violations including a leaking hull. She remained in New York and was not allowed to leave until repairs were made. Further extensive repairs were made in dry dock in Tampa, Florida, where inspectors found new safety problems.

The ship was next detained for a couple of days in August 2008 in Seward, Alaska for significant code violations.

In late 2008 she was laid up in Istanbul, Turkey for engine repairs.

== Final years ==
In April 2012, MS Ocean Pearl was sold for use in China as a floating casino, after International Shipping Partners, the former owner of the MS Gemini and the MS Ocean Pearl, issued a statement saying that both ships would be available for sale or charter after the insolvency of Happy Cruises. She was renamed Formosa Queen and operated by Asia Star Cruises.

In November 2013, Formosa Queen was sold for scrap and she was broken up in China in 2014.

== Gallery ==
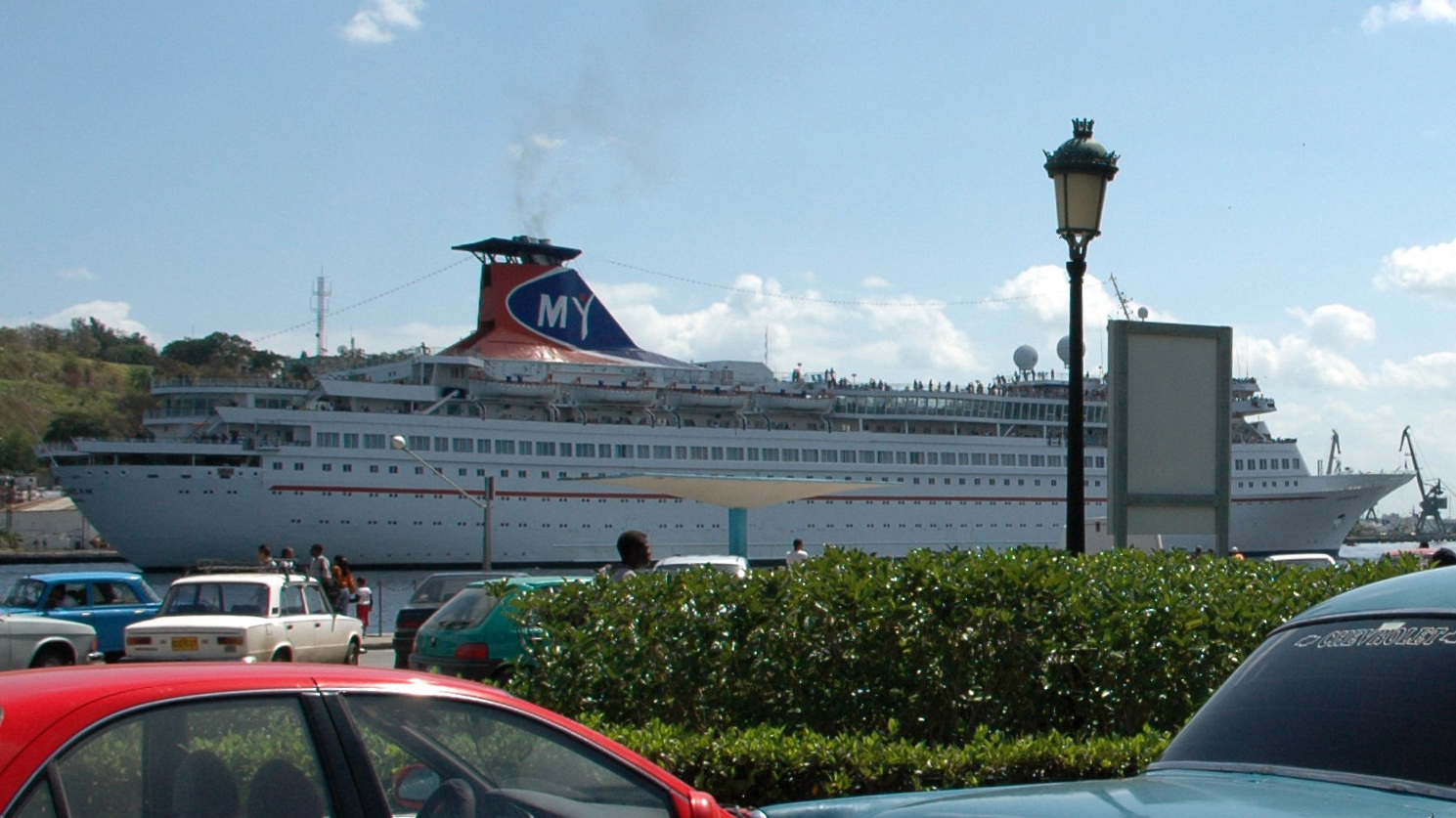
Sundream in Havana Harbor, April 2003

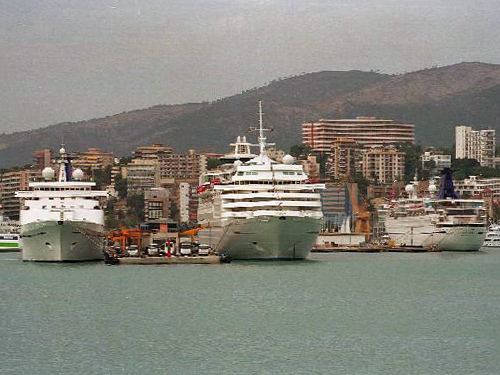
Sundream (left), Sunbird (center) and Carousel (right)

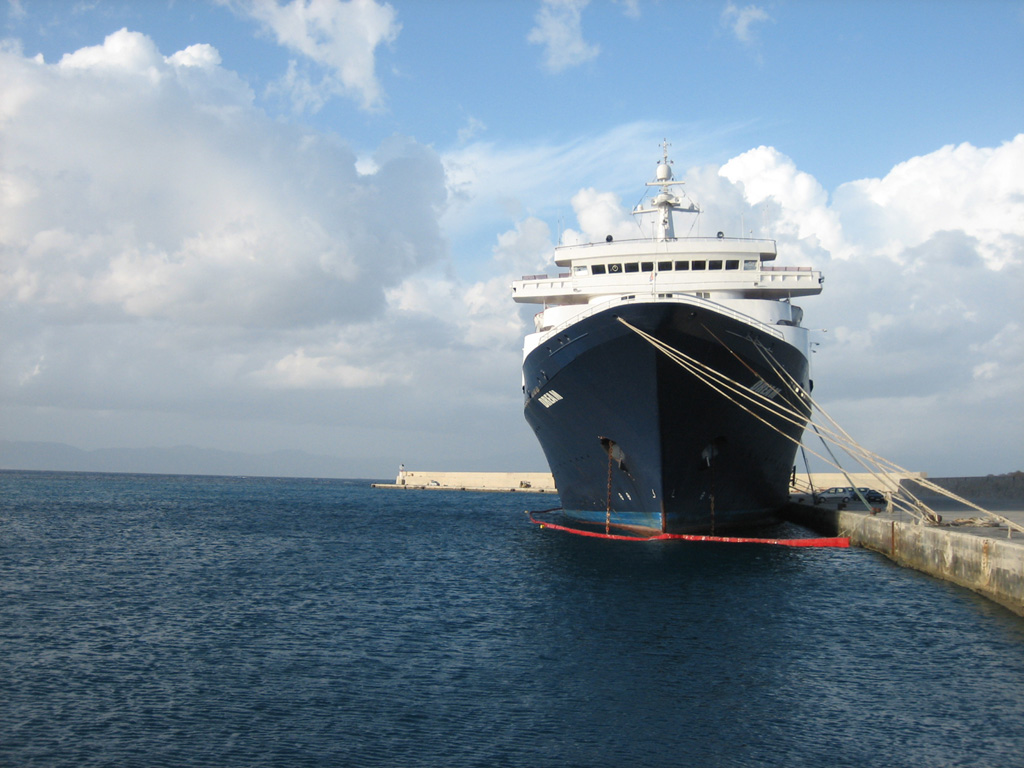
Dream anchored in the Port of Rhodes in November 2007. Protective nets have been placed around the hull to prevent oil leakage.

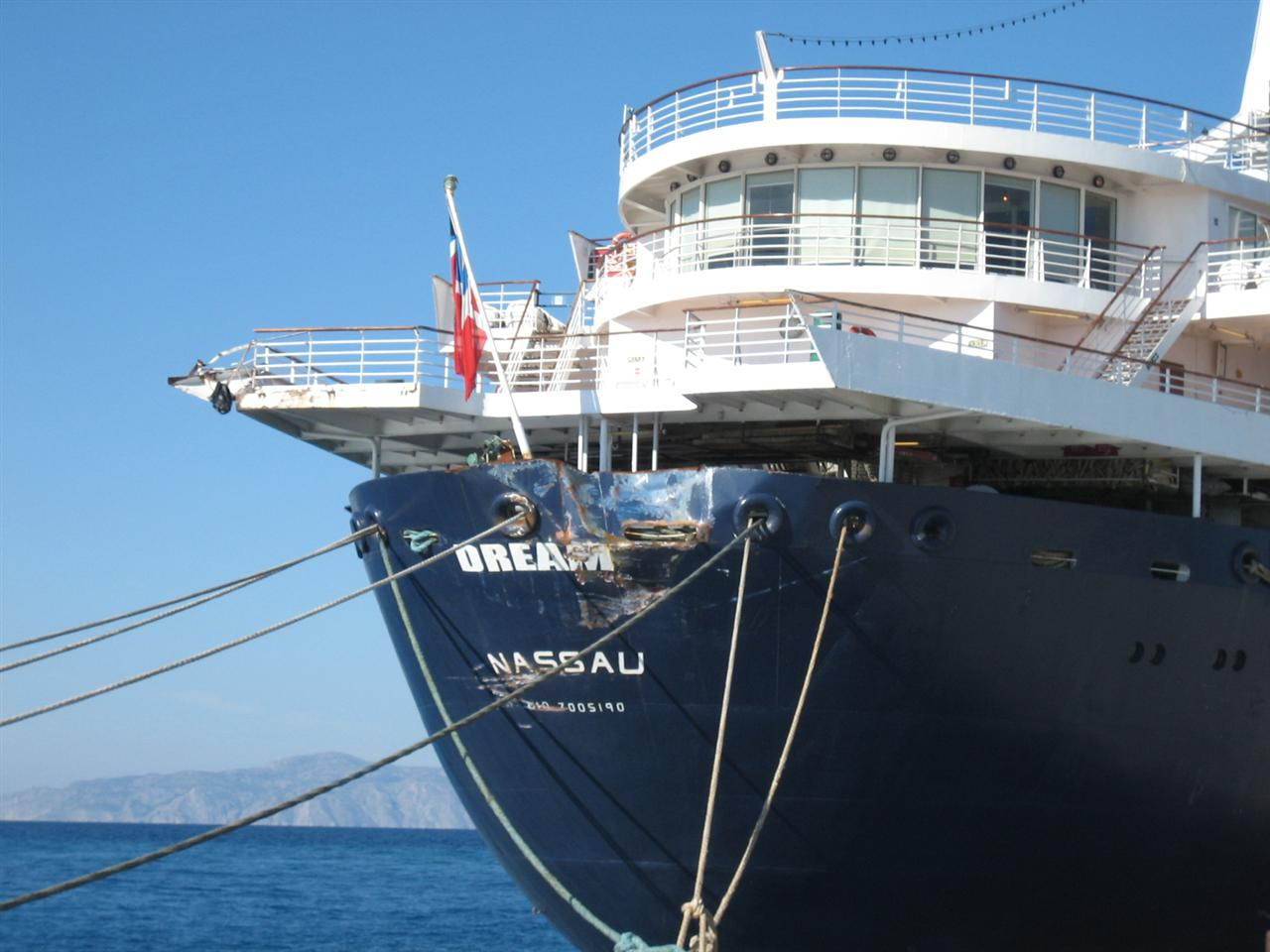
The damaged stern of Dream after her collision with an adjacent vessel on November 18, 2007.

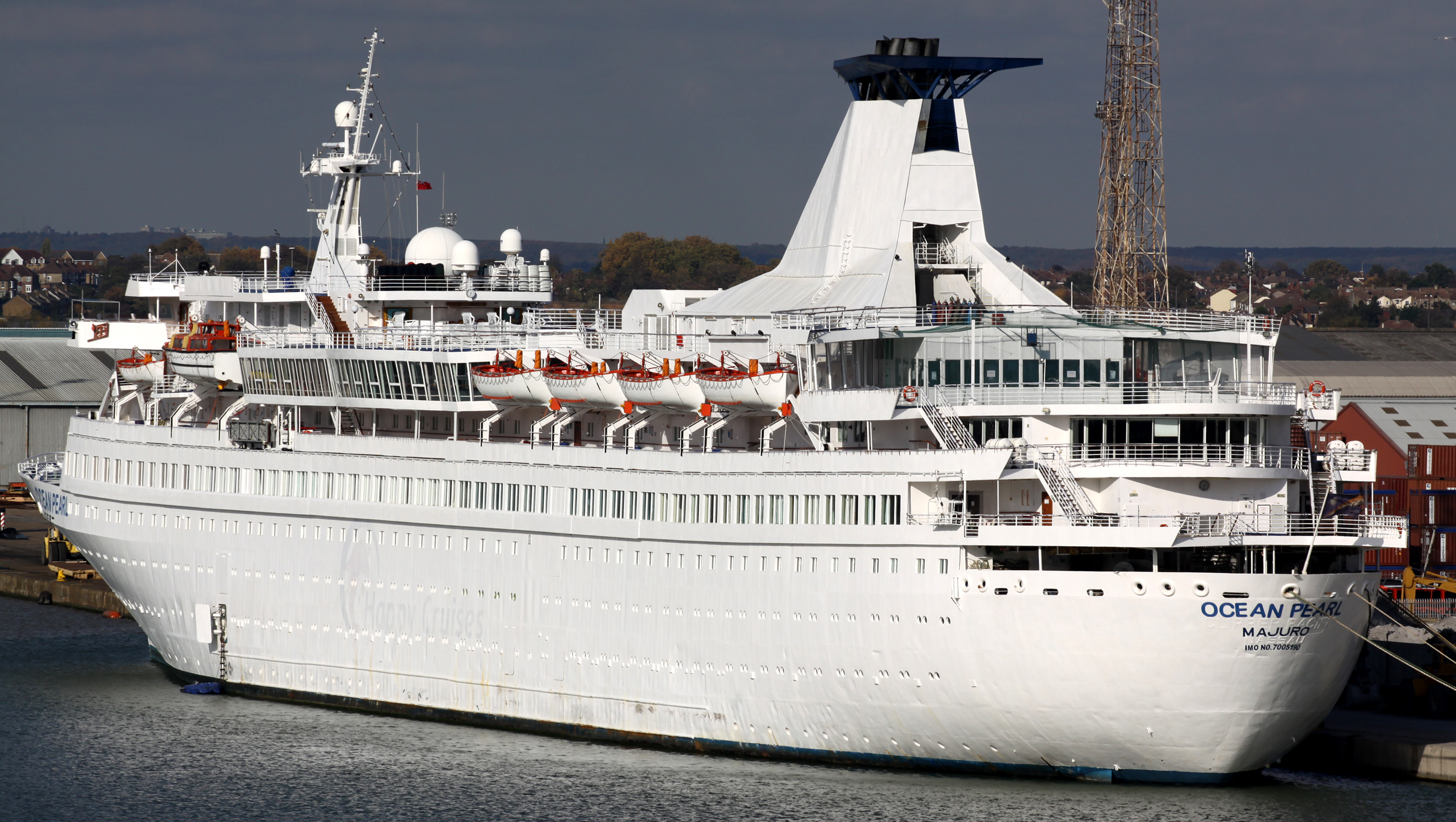
Ocean Pearl in Tilbury on 29 October 2011
