= MV Discovery Sun =

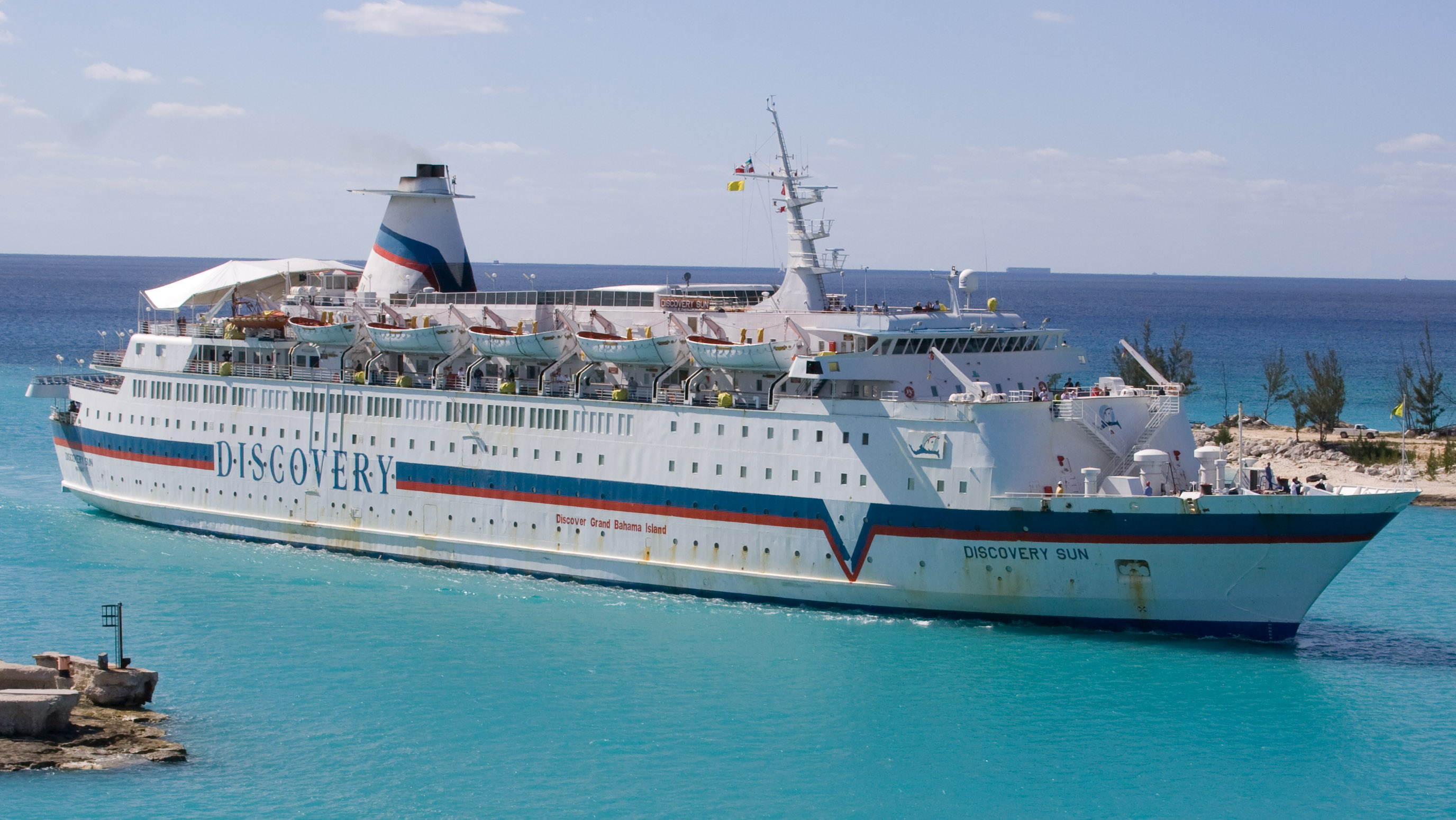
- Discovery Sun entering Lucayan Harbor

History
- Name: Za Dur (2011); MV Discovery Sun (1994–2011); Balanga Queen (1992–1994); Scandinavian Sun (1982–1992); Caribe Bremen (1981–1982); Caribe (1976–1981); Svea Star (1973–1976); Freeport (1973–1974); Freeport I (1968–1973); Freeport (1968)
- Owner: Discovery Cruise Line
- Operator: Discovery Cruise Line
- Port of registry: 1994–2011: Nassau, Bahamas; 2011–2012: Moroni, Comoros
- Builder: Orenstein-Koppel und Lübecker Machinenbau, Lübeck, Germany
- Yard number: 658
- Launched: 20 April 1968
- Identification: Call sign: C6FP7; IMO number: 6815158; MMSI number: 308002000
- Fate: Scrapped 13 February 2012

General characteristics
- Tonnage: 11,979 GT
- Length: 134 metres (440 ft)
- Beam: 21 metres (69 ft)
- Capacity: 1,010

MV Discovery Sun was the flagship and sole ship of Discovery Cruise Lines, a Miami-based tour operator. She was built at the Orenstein & Koppel shipyard in Lübeck, Germany in 1968 and was renovated in 1995 and then updated in 2000. She was previously named Scandinavian Sun for day cruise operator SeaEscape.

MV Discovery Sun provided a regular service from Port Everglades in Fort Lauderdale to Grand Bahama Island and acted as a passenger cruise ferry service.

On 20 August 1984, while operating as the Scandinavian Sun, a fire broke as the ship was docking at the Port of Miami. The fire was started by lubricating oil leaking from a diesel generator, and spread through a ladder access way and open passageways to the passenger areas of the ship. One crew member and one passenger were killed, and 57 passengers and crew were injured.

== Fate ==
In September 2011, Discovery Cruise Lines ceased operations, citing high operating costs and lack of profitability. Discovery Sun was subsequently offered for sale, but there was no buyer or charterer. Discovery Sun was broken up for scrap at Chittagong on 13 February 2012.
