= Wallenius Lines =

Swedish shipping company

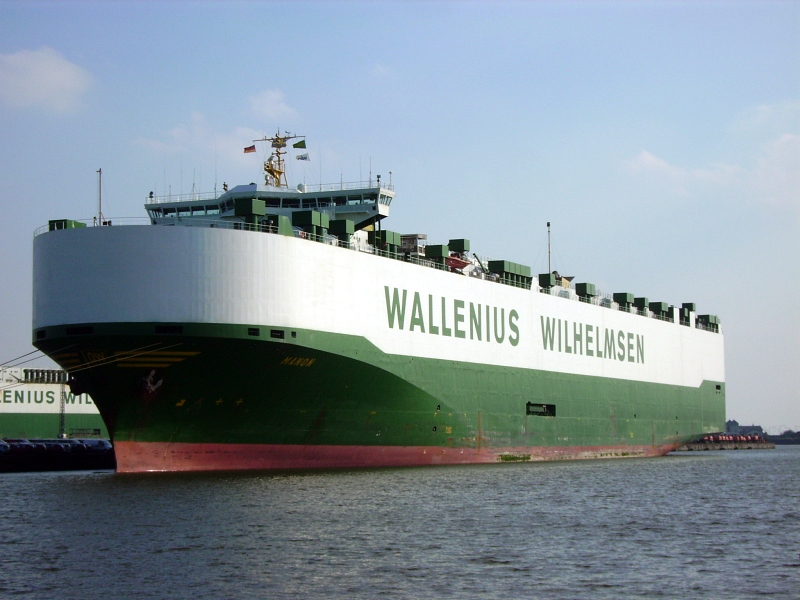
- Manon in Bremerhaven, Germany
- Company type: Subsidiary
- Industry: Car carrier shipping
- Founded: 1934
- Founder: Olof Wallenius
- Headquarters: Stockholm, Sweden
- Area served: Worldwide
- Parent: Soya Group
- Website: www.walleniuslines.com

Wallenius Lines is a privately owned Swedish shipping company. It was founded in 1934 by Olof Wallenius. Wallenius Lines is an investor and active owner within the global shipping industry, specifically the international car and roll-on/roll-off segment. It is a subsidiary of the Soya Group.

== History ==
Wallenius Lines was founded in 1934 by Olof Wallenius.

In the 1960s, Wallenius pioneered the roll-on/roll-off concept, first on the North Atlantic trade and later on the Asian trade when Wallenius became the first independent shipping line to work with Japan’s automobile manufacturing industry.

In 2018, Wallenius Lines and Swedish Orient Line established Wallenius SOL to transport forestry products and other goods in the Gulf of Bothnia, Baltic Sea and North Sea, each owning 50%. In April 2026 Wallenius took full ownership.
