= MV Norsel =

Two motor ships have borne the name Norsel:

- MV Norsel (1945) was a 592-ton Norwegian sealer launched as Lyngdalsfjord on 10 April 1945, by Kaldnes Mekaniske Verksted in Tønsberg, Norway. Completed as Norsel in 1949, the ship
- MV Norsel (1972) is a 498-ton tanker built as Rose-Marie S. in 1972, by Gutehoffnungshütte in Duisburg, Germany. Sold in 1994 and renamed Norsel, the ship was again sold in 2009 and renamed Scan Master. Still active as of 2014.
