= Bay of Whales =

Bay

Coordinates: 78°30′S 164°20′W

Map depicting the location of the Bay of Whales on the Ross Ice Shelf in Antarctica

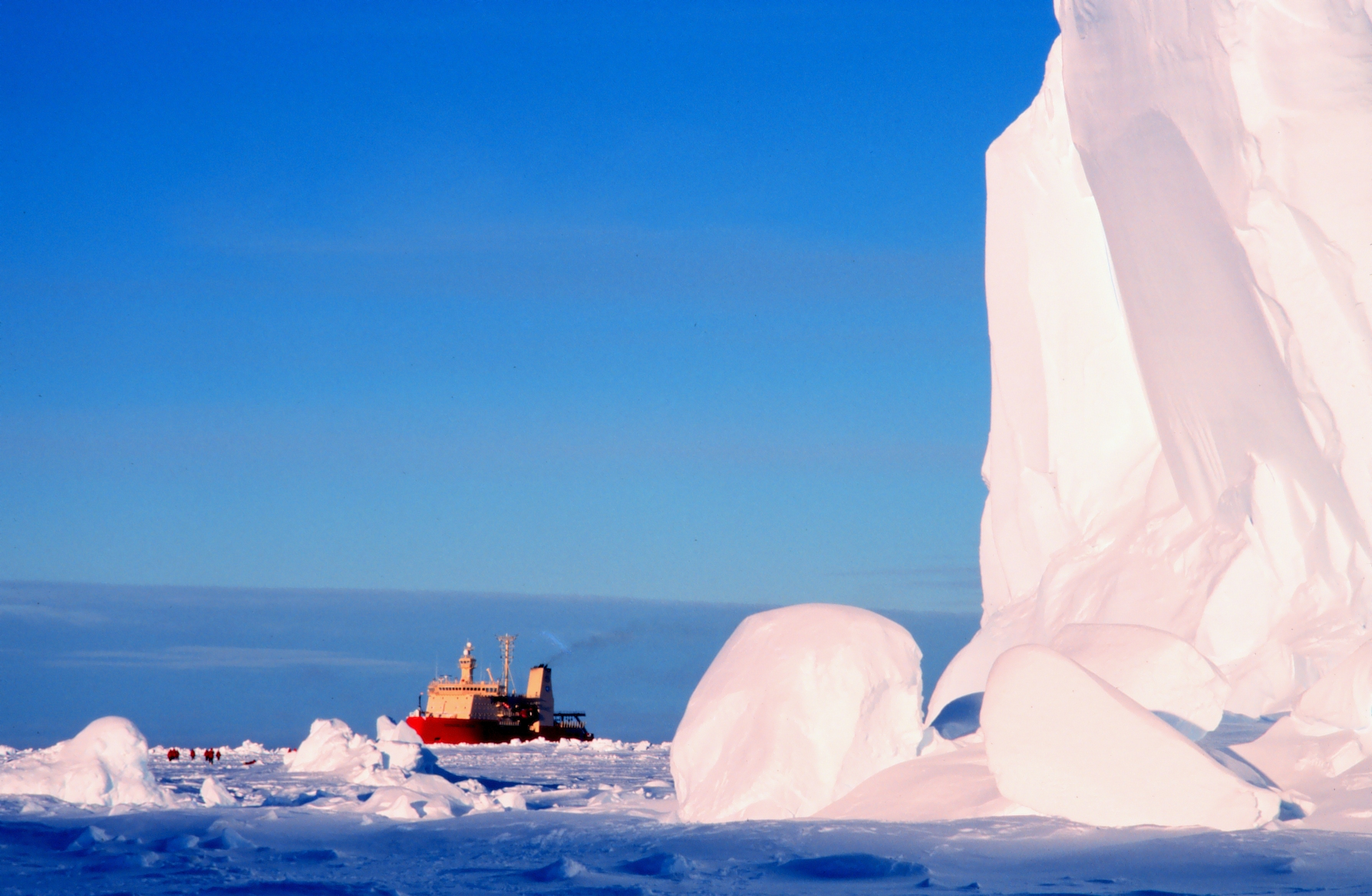
The RV Nathaniel B. Palmer research vessel using the Bay of Whales ice harbour

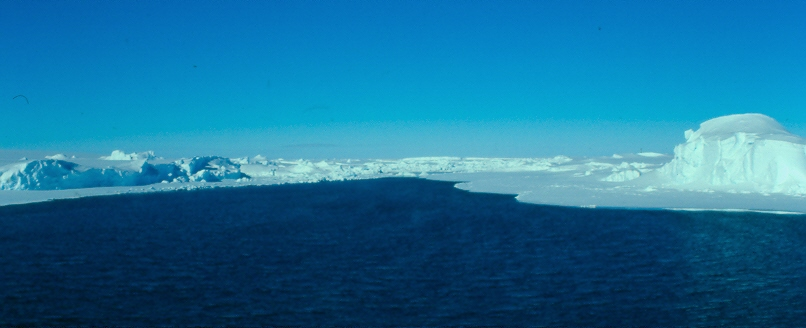
Bay of Whales

The Bay of Whales was a natural ice harbour, or iceport, indenting the front of the Ross Ice Shelf just north of Roosevelt Island, Antarctica, at the southernmost point of the world's ocean. While the Ross Sea stretches considerably further south – encompassing the Gould Coast, located around 320 kilometres (170 nautical miles) from the South Pole – the majority of this expanse is covered by the Ross Ice Shelf, rather than open sea.

== Discovery and naming ==
Ernest Shackleton named the feature on January 24, 1908, during the Nimrod Expedition, because of the large number of whales seen near this location.

== History ==
During his quest for the South Pole, Norwegian explorer Roald Amundsen established a temporary base, which he named Framheim, at the Bay of Whales. The base was used between January 1911 – February 1912, and was named after Amundsen's ship Fram.

The Bay of Whales was a logistical support base for Richard E. Byrd's first (1928–1930), second (1933–1935), and third expedition (1939–1941)

The configuration of the Bay of Whales continuously changed. A survey by the second Byrd expedition in 1934 determined that the feature lay at the junction of two separate ice systems, the movements of which are influenced by the presence of Roosevelt Island. Commander Glen Jacobsen, USN, who visited aboard the USS Atka in January 1955, found that calving of the ice shelf rendered the iceport temporarily unusable.

The Bay of Whales was entirely eliminated in 1987 when the 154-kilometre-long (83 nmi) Iceberg B-9 broke off from the Ross Ice Shelf.

The Whale Bay Furrows, a series of undersea valleys on the central Ross continental shelf, were named in association with the Bay of Whales.

== Most southerly navigation ==
Due to its location and topography, the Bay of Whales is the place where ships have been able to reach the southernmost location on the planet, where it is possible to travel to by sea. As it is an indentation on the northern face of the Ross Ice Shelf, which changes shape and geographic location as sections calve off into the abutting ocean and the extent of the shelf itself either moves north or south over time, this theoretical limit has also changed over time. As a result, the point of most southerly navigation reached has been, and continues to be, broken as changes occur and adjacent ice and other conditions allow.

First discovered by Carsten Borchgrevink on 16 February 1900, the SS Southern Cross sailed to approximately 78°40’S (unverified) when he and two others made the first landing on the Ross Ice Shelf at this location.

On 16 January 2001, the Russian icebreaker Kapitan Khlebnikov reached a confirmed southernmost record for shipping in Antarctica at 78°37’S. The ship, commanded by Russian Captain Petr Golikov and chartered by Quark Expeditions, reached the site in the late afternoon. Expedition staff assisted 96 passengers to land at this historic location.

In January 2014 Captain Russell Pugh, with Expedition Leader Tim Soper and crew, commanded the expedition yacht MY Arctic P on a month long voyage to the Ross Sea region where the vessel nosed into the ice to set a new record for the most southerly position of any vessel ever: 78°43.0336’S, 163°42.1317’W, as officially recorded in the Guinness Book of World Records.

On 2 February 2016, the Akademik Shokalskiy (Russia) operating a tourist voyage carrying 48 international expeditioners for Heritage Expeditions (New Zealand) achieved a new furthest south when it reached 78°43.971’S

On 28 January 2017, MS The World broke the world record at that time for being the southernmost ship. The voyage was led by Captain Dag H. Sævik and Expedition Leader Rob McCallum, with 145 residents & guests and 272 crew. It reached 78°43.997’´S and 163°41.421’ W at the Bay of Whales.

On 26 February 2017, Spirit of Enderby, commanded by Captain Dmitry Zinchenko (Russia), reached 78°44·008´S, 163°41·434´W, the farthest south recorded by any ship. The expedition to the Bay of Whales was organised by Heritage Expeditions (New Zealand) and the latitude was confirmed by hand-held instruments aboard.

On 27th February 2022, the icebreaker Le Commandant Charcot commanded by Captain Stanislav Devorsine for Ponant, reached 78° 44.251'S in the Bay of Whales as part of a 30-day tourist voyage.

On January 31 2023, the Italian icebreaker R/V Laura Bassi (formerly Polar Queen and RRS Ernest Shackleton) set a record by sailing further south than any ship before, achieving 78°44.280´S in the Bay of Whales, which was made possible by an unusual lack of ice. The ship was captained by Franco Sedmak and had 58 people on board, members of the technical crew and the research team. For this achievement, the vessel and its team were awarded the 29th Premio Barcola.

On 25 February 2026, the expedition cruise ship, Douglas Mawson, commanded by Captain Jorge Ferdinez (Panama) and Expedition Leader Howard Whelan (Australia), reached 78°44·405´S, 163°40·220´W, setting a new record for the farthest south position that has been achieved by any vessel. The expedition was visiting the Bay of Whales as part of a tourism voyage operated by Aurora Expeditions (Australia), and the latitude was confirmed by multiple GPS instruments installed on the vessel. Aboard the vessel were 89 crew, 20 expedition staff, and 84 passengers, representing 35 different nationalities.

== See also ==
- Ice pier
- Atka Iceport
- Erskine Iceport
- Godel Iceport
- Norsel Iceport
