= Sea ice decline =

Sea ice decline refers to the melting of sea ice in the polar regions:

- In the Arctic: Arctic sea ice decline
- In the Antarctic: Antarctica#Glaciers and floating ice and Antarctic sea ice#Recent trends and climate change
