= Whale Bay =

Whale Bay may refer to:

- The English name for Walvis Bay in Namibia
- Whale Bay, a surfing venue near Raglan, New Zealand
- Bay of Whales, Antarctica
