= Godel Iceport =

Coordinates: 70°09′S 21°45′E

Godel Iceport is an iceport about 5 nautical miles (9 km) wide, which marks a more-or-less permanent indentation in the seaward front of the extensive ice shelf fringing the coast of Queen Maud Land.

== Discovery and naming ==
Godel Iceport was named by United States Navy Operation Deep Freeze I personnel on the USS Glacier (AGB-4), who made a running survey of this coast in March 1956, for William H. Godel, deputy director of the Office of Special Operations, Department of the Navy, who assisted in formulating expedition plans and policy.

The term "iceport" was suggested by the Advisory Committee on Antarctic Names in 1956 to denote an ice shelf indentation, subject to configuration changes, which may offer anchorage or possible access to the upper surface of an ice shelf via ice ramps along one or more sides of the feature.

== See also ==
- Ice pier
- Atka Iceport
- Erskine Iceport
- Norsel Iceport
- Bay of Whales
