= Erskine Iceport =

Iceport in Antarctica

Erskine Iceport (69°56′S 19°12′E), also known as Erskine Bay or General Erskine Bay, is an iceport about 3 nautical miles (6 km) wide and 6 nautical miles (11 km) long, which marks a more-or-less permanent indentation extending southeast into the seaward front of the extensive ice shelf fringing Queen Maud Land.

== Discovery and naming ==
United States Navy Operation Deep Freeze I personnel on the USS Glacier made a running survey of this coast in March 1956. They applied the name "General Erskine Bay" for General Graves B. Erskine, United States Marine Corps, director of the U.S. Navy Office of Special Operations, who assisted in formulating expedition plans and policy. The term "iceport" was suggested by the Advisory Committee on Antarctic Names in 1956 to denote an ice shelf indentation, subject to configuration changes, which may offer anchorage or possible access to the upper surface of an ice shelf via ice ramps along one or more sides of the feature.

== See also ==
- Ice pier
- Atka Iceport
- Godel Iceport
- Norsel Iceport
- Bay of Whales
