= Polar ice packs (disambiguation) =

Polar ice packs may refer to:

- Sea ice
- Arctic ice pack
- Antarctic sea ice
