= Norsel Iceport =

Small iceport in Queen Maud Land, Antarctica

Norsel Iceport (71°01′S 11°00′W), also known as Norselbukta or Bukhta Nursel, is a small iceport in the front of the Quar Ice Shelf, along the coast of Queen Maud Land.

== Discovery and naming ==
This feature was named by the Norwegian–British–Swedish Antarctic Expedition (NBSAE), 1949–52, which used it to moor and unload the expedition ship Norsel. The low ice front permitted easy access onto Quar Ice Shelf, where the NBSAE established Maudheim Station about 1 nautical mile south of the iceport.

== See also ==
- Ice pier
- Atka Iceport
- Erskine Iceport
- Godel Iceport
- Bay of Whales
