= Atka Iceport =

Bay in Antarctica

Coordinates: 70°35′S 7°51′W

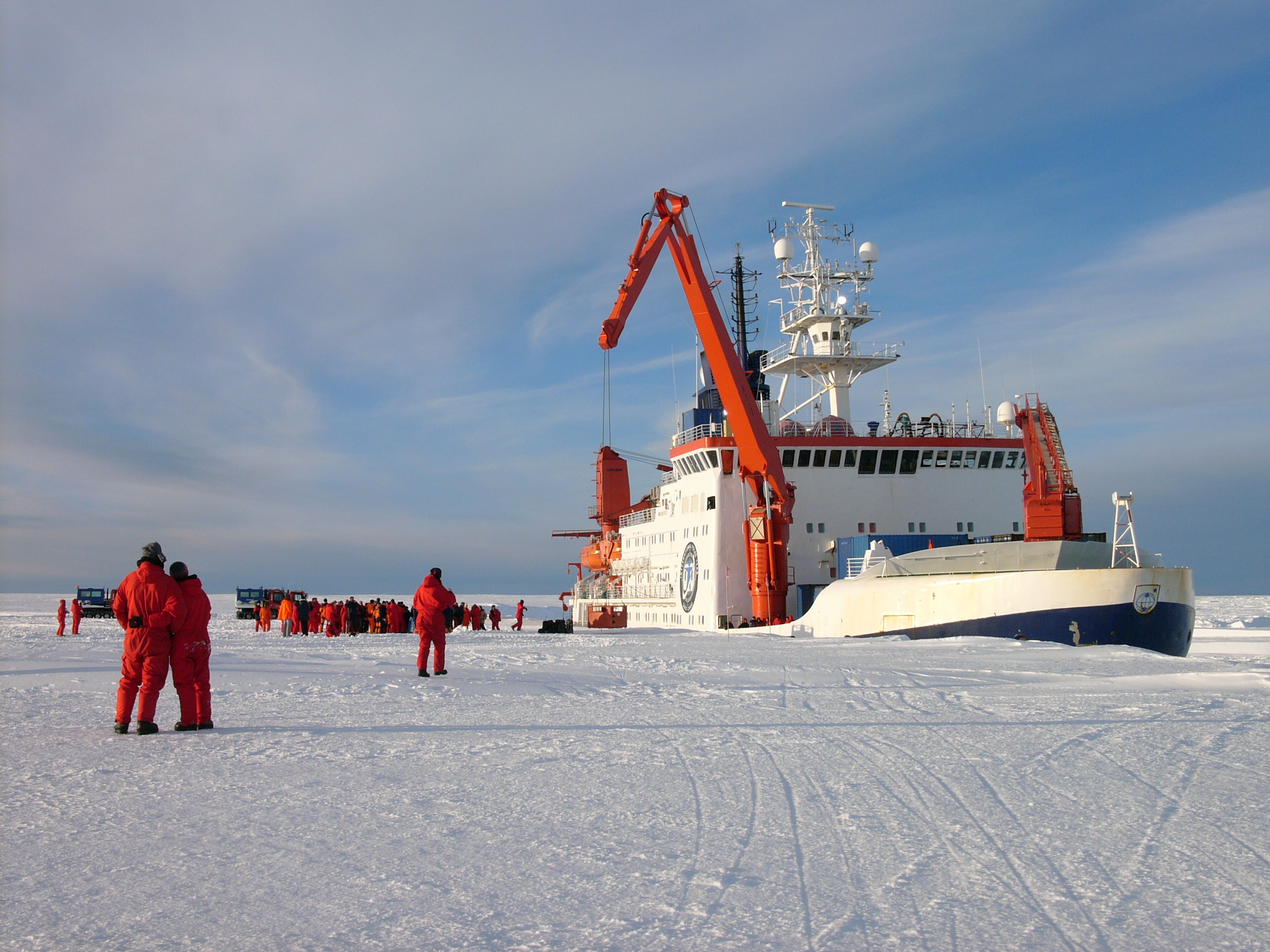
Icebreaker RV Polarstern in Atka Bay, serving Germany's Neumayer Station III

Atka Iceport, also known as Atka Bay, is an iceport about 10 miles (16 km) long and wide, marking a more-or-less permanent indentation in the front of the Ekstrom Ice Shelf on the coast of Queen Maud Land.

== Discovery and naming ==
Atka Iceport was mapped in detail by Norwegian cartographers from surveys and air photographs taken by the Norwegian-British-Swedish Antarctic Expedition (1949-1952), led by John Schjelderup Giæver. It was named by personnel of the USS Atka, under U.S. Navy Commander Glen Jacobsen, which moored here in February 1955 while investigating possible base sites for International Geophysical Year operations.

== Station ==
Atka Bay is the site of Germany's Neumayer Station III.

== Important Bird Area ==
A 425 ha tract of sea ice in the bay has been identified as an Important Bird Area by BirdLife International because it supports a breeding colony of about 12,000 emperor penguins.

== See also ==
- Ice pier
- Erskine Iceport
- Godel Iceport
- Norsel Iceport
- Bay of Whales
