= MV Lyubov Orlova =

Yugoslav-built ice-strengthened cruise ship

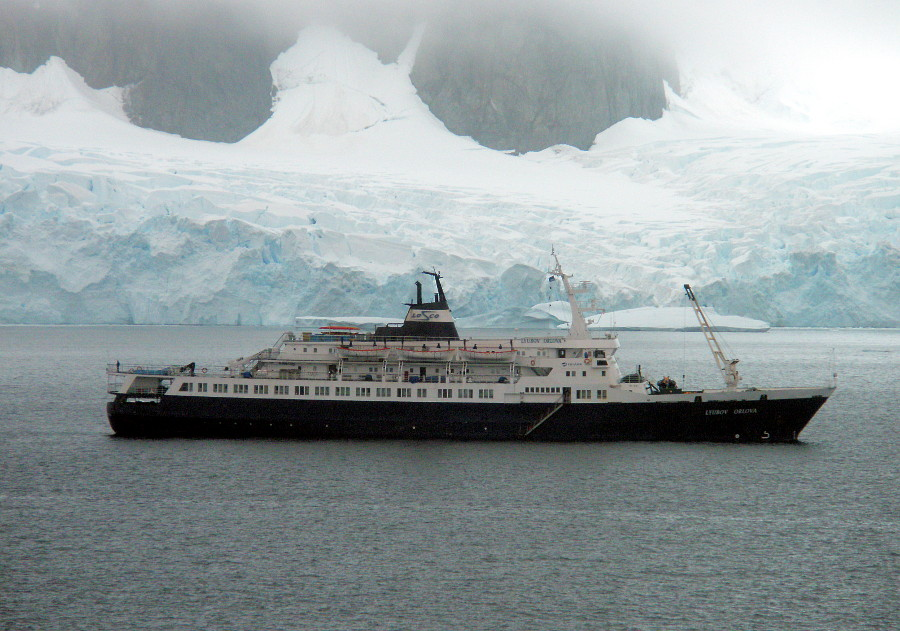
- Lyubov Orlova seen from Petermann Island.

History
- Name: Lyubovy Orlova (1976–1999); Lyubov Orlova (1999–2013)
- Owner: 1976-1996: Far Eastern Shipping Company (FESCO), Vladivostok; 1996-2013: Lubov Orlova Shipping Co Ltd, Malta & Novorossiysk
- Operator: Neptune International Shipping (2012–2013)
- Port of registry: Soviet Union, Vladivostok (1976–1992); Russia, Vladivostok (1992–1999); Cook Islands, Avatiu (1999–2013)
- Builder: Brodogradilište 'Titovo', Kraljevica, Yugoslavia SFR Yugoslavia (now Croatia)
- Yard number: 413
- Launched: 3 November 1975
- In service: 1976
- Out of service: February 2012, to be broken up
- Identification: IMO number: 7391434; Callsign E5U2246 (Cook Is); MMSI number: 518296000(Cook Is)
- Fate: Believed to be sunken

General characteristics
- Tonnage: 4,251 GT
- Length: 295 ft (90 m)
- Beam: 53 ft (16 m)
- Draught: 15 ft (4.6 m)
- Ice class: L3
- Installed power: Diesel engines; 5,280 bhp (combined)
- Propulsion: Two shafts
- Speed: 11 knots (20 km/h; 13 mph)
- Capacity: 110 passengers
- Crew: 70 (maximum)

MV Lyubov Orlova (built as Lyubovy Orlova) was a Yugoslavia-built ice-strengthened Maria Yermolova-class cruise ship, which was built in 1976 and primarily used for Antarctic cruises. After being taken out of service in 2010, she sat in St. John's, Newfoundland, Canada for two years. Decommissioning was fraught with problems and the ship eventually became a floating derelict in the North Atlantic Ocean in 2013. She is believed to have sunk.

== History ==
Lyubov Orlova was named after the Russian film star Lyubov Orlova. The ship was built for the Far Eastern Shipping Company based at Vladivostok in the Soviet Union. She served as an expedition cruise ship, like her sister MV Clipper Adventurer. Her hull was built to Finnish-Swedish ice class 1A, to withstand impacts with ice, and she often sailed in Antarctica and the Arctic.

In 1978, the ship was contracted for use in the film Bear Island, which was being filmed in Canada. For the film, the ship received a new paint scheme to transform her into the "British" ship, MS Morning Rose.

The ship was refurbished in 1999, and chartered by Marine Expeditions for cruises to the Antarctic Peninsula in 2000. She underwent extensive renovations in 2002 and was subsequently chartered by Quark Expeditions for the Antarctic and Cruise North Expeditions for the Arctic.

Lyubov Orlova ran aground at Deception Island, Antarctica, on 27 November 2006. She was towed off by the Spanish Navy icebreaker Las Palmas and made her own way to Ushuaia, Tierra del Fuego.

== Loss ==
=== Decommissioning ===
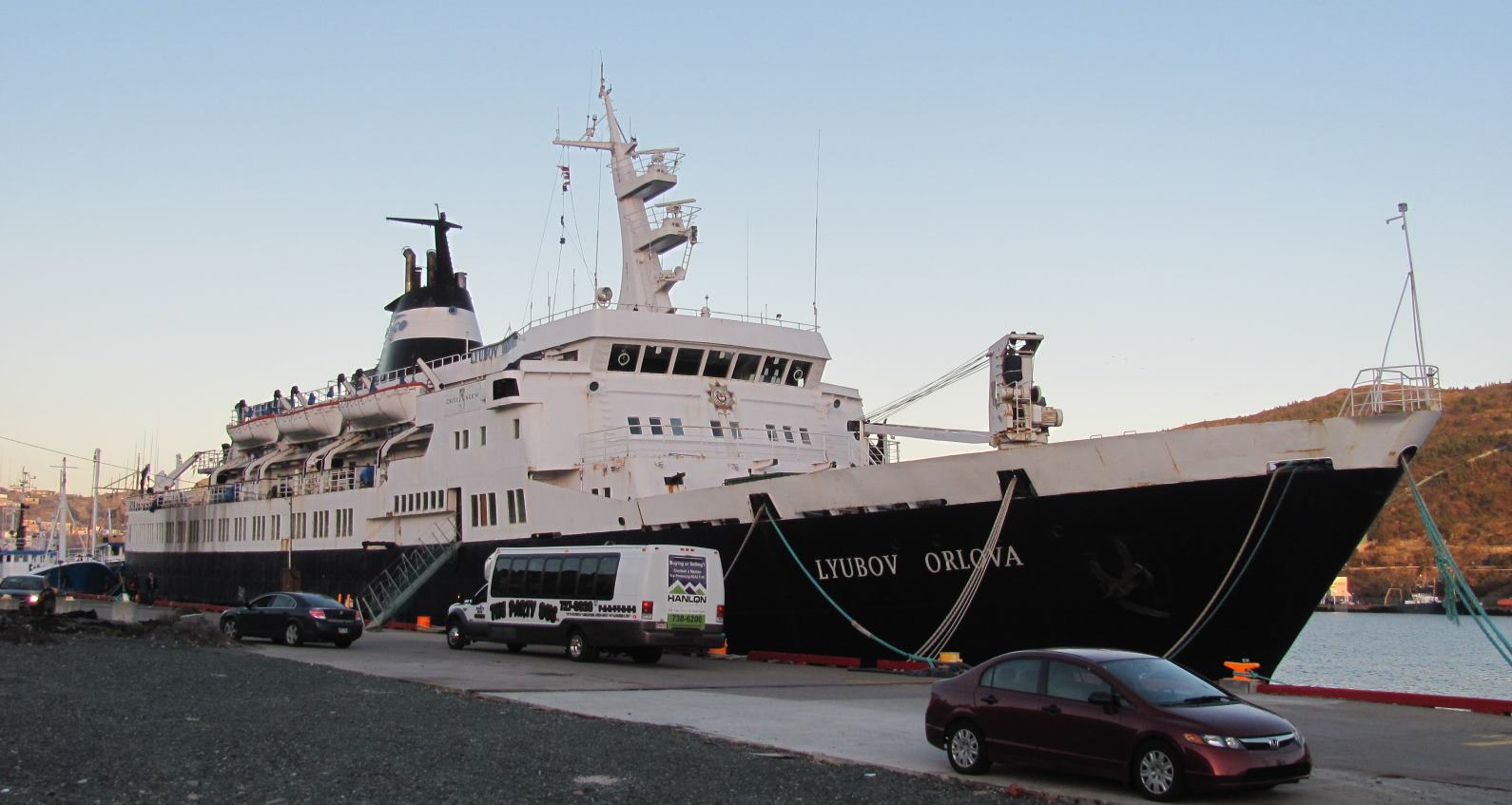
Lyubov Orlova derelict dockside in St. John's, 2012

In September 2010, Lyubov Orlova was seized at St John's, Newfoundland, Canada due to debts of US$251,000 owed to the charterer, Cruise North Expeditions, from a cruise which was cancelled because of faults with the ship. In addition, the 51 crew members had not been paid in five months. The ship was impounded in Newfoundland and, in February 2012, was sold to Neptune International Shipping to be broken up.

=== Salvage and abandonment ===
The derelict vessel had been tied up in St. John's harbour for over two years and was being towed to the Dominican Republic to be scrapped. The tug Charlene Hunt, owned by American tug operator Hunt Marine, was contracted to tow the ship. The day after leaving the dock, the tow line parted. The crew of the tugboat tried to reconnect the line but was hampered by 35 km/h (22 mph) winds and 3 m (9.8 ft) waves. By 28 January 2013, Lyubov Orlova was drifting slowly eastward off the southeastern end of the Avalon Peninsula in Canada.

The offshore supply vessel Atlantic Hawk, with a 157 tonne continuous bollard pull rating, under contract by Husky Energy, was tasked with regaining control of the drifting vessel, which was a risk to oil and gas operations in the region. On 1 February 2013, Transport Canada announced that on 31 January, Atlantic Hawk had successfully gained control of Lyubov Orlova.

Once in international waters, Transport Canada decided to cut her loose. "The Lyubov Orlova no longer poses a threat to the safety of offshore oil installations, their personnel or the marine environment. The vessel has drifted into international waters and given current patterns and predominant winds, it is very unlikely that the vessel will re-enter waters under Canadian jurisdiction," the department said in a statement, giving safety concerns as their reason for not pursuing a salvage operation.

The ship was located on 4 February, approximately 250 nautical miles east of St. John's, (approximately 50 nautical miles outside Canada's territorial waters) and drifting in a northeasterly direction. She could have ended up almost anywhere from the Norwegian Arctic to western Africa, or stuck in the middle of the North Atlantic Gyre. Transport Canada reiterated that the owner of the vessel remained responsible for her movements, and measures had been taken to monitor the position of the drifting ship.

On 23 February, according to the National Geospatial-Intelligence Agency, Lyubov Orlova was spotted at roughly 1,300 nautical miles from the Irish coast. A week later, the ship was the subject of news reports in Ireland and Iceland, and a caution to smaller vessels was issued. On 1 March, Irish media reported that a signal from the vessel's emergency position-indicating radio beacon (EPIRB) was received from 700 nautical miles off the Kerry coast, still in international waters. An EPIRB starts transmitting only when the device is exposed to water, leading experts to speculate that the ship may have sunk. The Irish Air Corps was expected to continue to monitor the region.

A review published in October 2013 cites the receipt of two EPIRB distress signals from Lyubov Orlova in mid-ocean, one on 23 February and another on 12 March.

==== Route ====
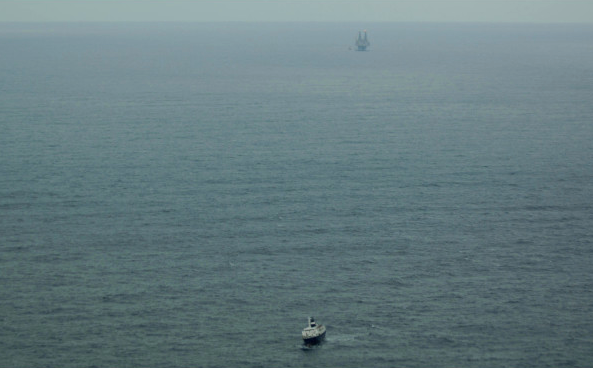
Lyubov Orlova drifting in North Atlantic Ocean, near Hibernia oil field, on January 30, 2013.

- September 2010–23 January 2013, St John's, Newfoundland harbour, 47°33′49″N 52°42′4″W
- 24 January 2013: tow lost
- 1 February 2013: second tow secured
- c. 7 February 2013: tow cut loose in international waters
- 23 February 2013: spotted 1,300 nautical miles (2,400 km; 1,500 mi) from Ireland 49°22.70′N 44°51.34′W

The ship is believed to have sunk in international waters after the EPIRB distress signals were activated in early 2013. As of 2026, her wreck has not been found.

=== Tabloid speculation ===
In January 2014, there was speculation based on an interview with a salvager in the British tabloid The Sun that the ship might be nearing the coast of England and be infested with cannibal rats. The rumours were subsequently debunked.

In November 2017, the British tabloid the Daily Star speculated that wreckage buried in sand on the beach at Coronado, California, might be the missing MV Lyubov Orlova, but the wreck is actually that of the SS Monte Carlo.

== Influence ==
News coverage by the CBC and other news sources inspired the Canadian rock band Billy Talent to write the song "Ghost Ship of Cannibal Rats" for their sixth studio album, Afraid Of Heights.
