= MV Ocean Adventurer =

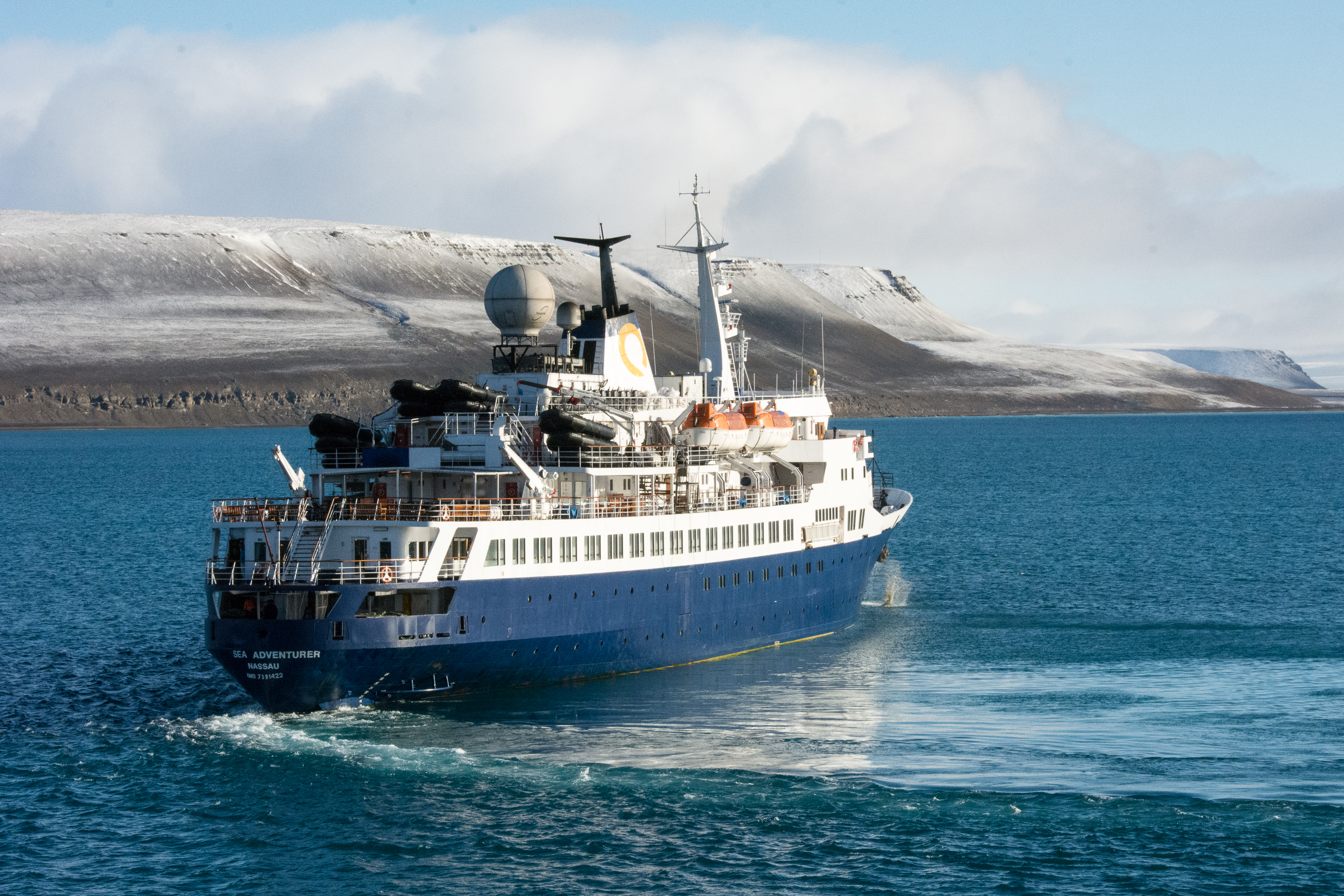
- Expedition ship, MV Ocean Adventurer, weighs anchor to depart from Beechey Island, Nunavut, Canada.

History
- Name: 1975–1997: Alla Tarasova; 1997–2012: Clipper Adventurer; 2012–2017: Sea Adventurer; 2017–2025: Ocean Adventurer; 2025–present: Expedition
- Owner: SunStone Ships Inc
- Operator: G Adventures
- Port of registry: 1975–1992: Murmansk, Soviet Union; 1992–1997: Murmansk, Russia; 1997–2012: Nassau, Bahamas
- Builder: Brodogradilište 'Titovo', Kraljevica, Yugoslavia SFR Yugoslavia (now Croatia)
- Yard number: 408
- Launched: 19 April 1975
- In service: 1975
- Identification: Call sign: C6PG6; IMO number: 7391422; MMSI number: 309997000
- Status: In service

General characteristics (Refitted in 2017)
- Class & type: Maria Yermolova-class passenger ship
- Tonnage: 4,376 tons
- Length: 100.58 m (330 ft 0 in)
- Beam: 16.31 m (53 ft 6 in)
- Draught: 4.72 m (15 ft 6 in)
- Decks: 6
- Ice class: 1A
- Propulsion: 2 Bergen Engines diesel engines, 5,400 hp (4,000 kW) combined power; 500 hp (370 kW) bow thruster; controllable pitch propellers
- Speed: 12 knots (22 km/h; 14 mph)
- Capacity: 128
- Crew: 87

MV Expedition is an ice-capable expedition cruise ship operating commercial voyages to both polar regions, with G Adventures and formerly with Quark Expeditions of Seattle, Washington, United States.

The vessel was previously been registered as Clipper Adventurer, and was renamed as Sea Adventurer on 1 October 2012. She is the sister ship to Lyubov Orlova. Built in 1975 in the former Yugoslavia as Alla Tarasova, she underwent a $13 million refit in 1998 managed by Master Mariner AB, Sweden.

During the summer of 2009 Adventure Canada of Mississauga, Ontario, Canada carried passengers through the Northwest Passage on Clipper Adventurer.

On 27 August 2010, Clipper Adventurer ran aground on a supposedly uncharted rock in the waters of Nunavut's Coronation Gulf during a cruise. The collision damaged the ship's ballast and fuel tanks, leading pollution to be released into the Coronation Gulf. 128 passengers and 69 crew members were stranded until they were rescued by CCGS Amundsen. It was later found that the rock was indeed a known hazard and had already been properly reported by the Canadian Hydrographic Service.

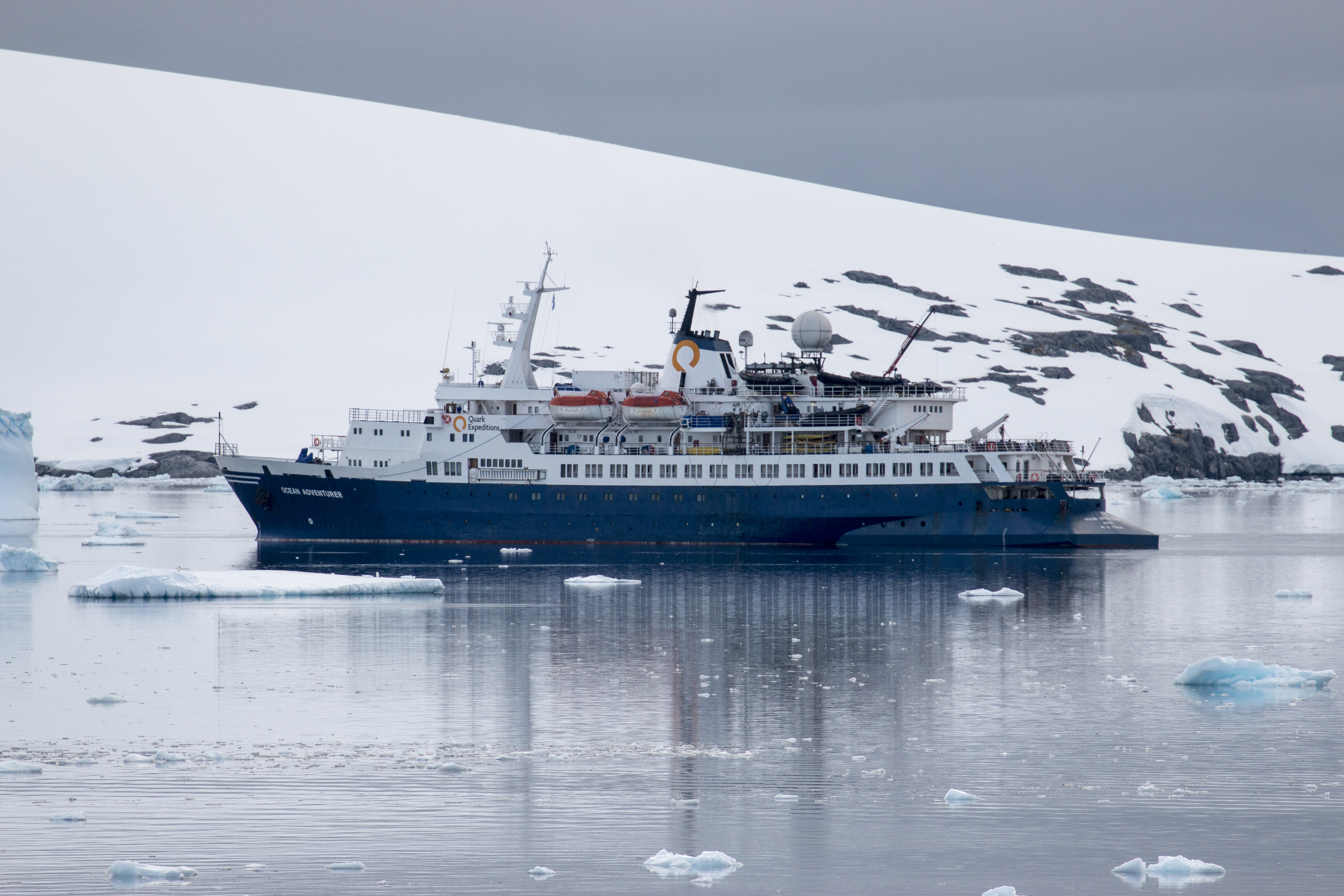
Quark Expeditions Ocean Adventurer in the Lemiare Channel, Antarctica

The salvage job was awarded to Resolve Marine Group, a Florida-based Salvage company. On 18 September 2010, the ship was successfully towed into Cambridge Bay.

The ship spent many years chartered by Quark Expeditions sailing to Antarctica. Quark announced that the ship would be decommissioned from their fleet in October 2024.

In 2025, Ocean Adventurer returned to Antarctica with SunStone Ships Inc, a new expedition cruise line founded by industry veterans. She was chartered to G Adventures and renamed Expedition.
