= Iceport =

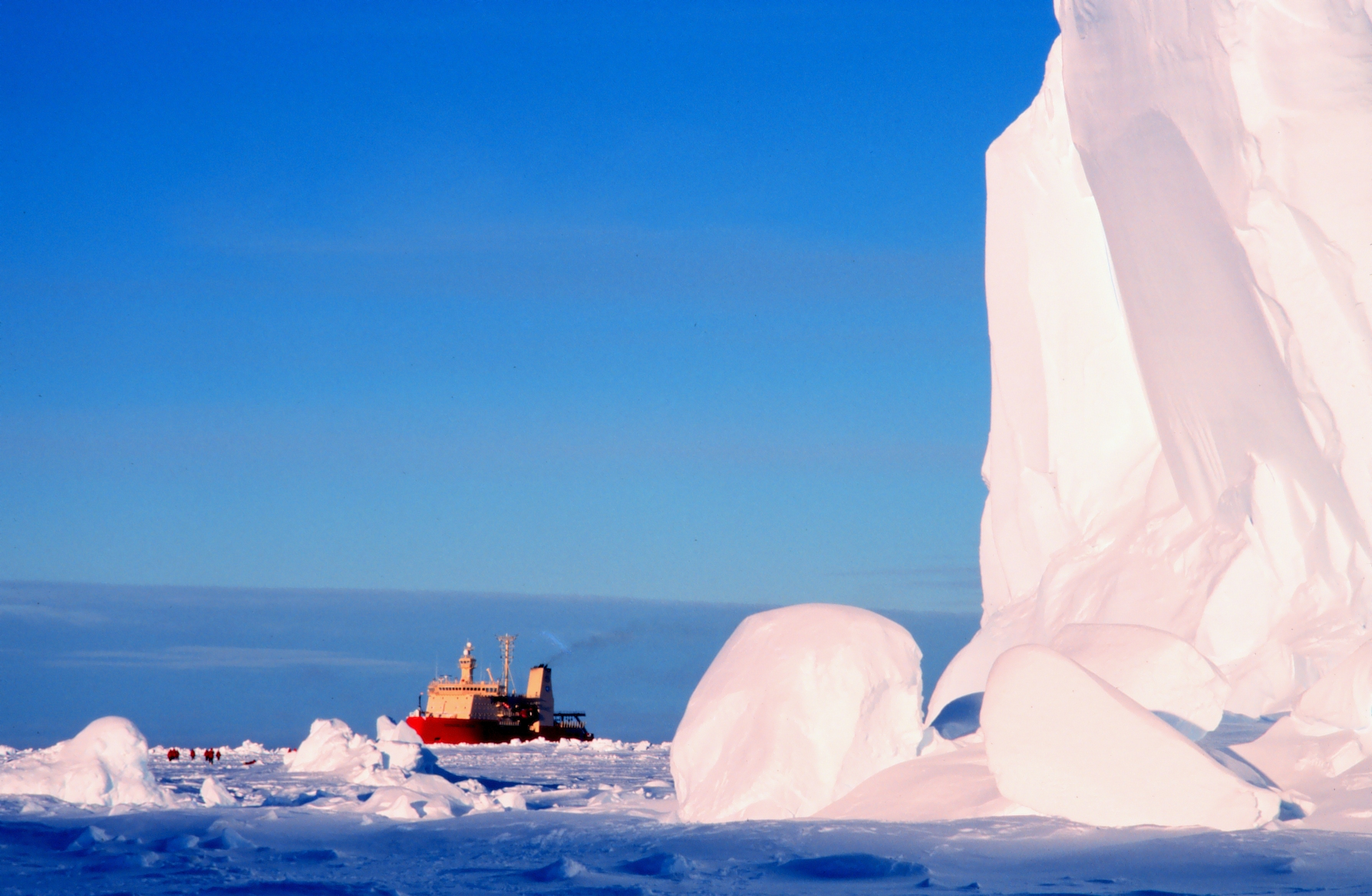
The RV Nathaniel B. Palmer research vessel using the iceport at Bay of Whales, Antarctica.

An iceport is a more-or-less permanent indentation in the front of an ice shelf, that can serve as a natural ice harbour. Though useful, they are not always reliable, as calving of surrounding ice shelves can render an iceport temporarily unstable and unusable.

== Historical and present use of iceports ==
Iceports have played a critical role in Antarctic exploration. For example, the Bay of Whales (discovered and named by Ernest Shackleton in the Nimrod in 1908) served as the base for several important Antarctic expeditions, including:

- 1910-1912: Amundsen's South Pole expedition, led by Roald Amundsen
- 1928-1930: Richard Evelyn Byrd - First expedition
- 1933-1935: Richard Evelyn Byrd - Second expedition
- 1939-1941: United States Antarctic Service Expedition, led by Richard Evelyn Byrd

Norsel Iceport was used by the Norwegian-British-Swedish Antarctic Expedition (NBSAE) to moor and unload the expedition ship Norsel in 1949. The NBSAE established Maudheim Station about 1 mile south of the iceport.

The term iceport was first suggested by the Advisory Committee on Antarctic Names (US-ACAN) in 1956 to denote "ice shelf embayments, subject to configuration changes, which may offer anchorage or possible access to the upper surface of an ice shelf via ice ramps along one or more sides of the feature".

Prior to the invention of the ice pier, U.S. ships participating in Operation Deep Freeze discharged cargo at temporary iceports in McMurdo Sound. At that time, freighters and tankers arriving with supplies and fuel were forced to dock as far away as 16 km from the harbor. Ships would moor alongside seasonal pack ice, where longshoremen would offload cargo onto large sleds. Snowcats and tractors would then be used to tow the freight over ice to McMurdo Station, a difficult and potentially dangerous operation.

U.S. Navy engineers constructed the first floating ice pier at McMurdo Station, Antarctica's southernmost sea port, in 1973. Since that time, the use of iceports has declined but not been eliminated.

== Locations of Antarctic iceports ==
Iceports in Antarctica include:

- Atka Iceport (70°35′S 7°51′W)
- Erskine Iceport (69°56′S 19°12′E)
- Godel Iceport (70°09′S 21°45′E)
- Norsel Iceport (71°01′S 1°10′W)
- Bay of Whales (78°30′S 164°20′W)

== See also ==
- Ice pier
