= Maria Yermolova-class passenger ship =

Yugoslavian passenger ships

Maria Yermolova-class ships are passenger ships built in the Titovo Brodogradiliste shipyard in Kraljevica, Yugoslavia in the 1970s. The construction of the ships was also known as project 1454. The class was named after the lead ship of the project, the Maria Yermolova, built in 1974, named after Russian actress Maria Yermolova.

== History ==
The passenger ships of this project were made from 1974 to 1978, under a colossal provincial shipyard contract USSR signed by order of Leonid Brezhnev at the personal request of Marshal Tito for the salvation of this Croatian shipyard in Yugoslavia. Eight ice-class vessels of project 1454 were built, the only of their kind in the world. Three vessels were delivered to Murmansk Shipping Company (MMP), four to Far East Shipping Company (FESCO), and one vessel to the Sakhalin Shipping Company - NSR Kholmsk. The vessels were built in two series. The first series consisted of: Maria Yermolova, Maria Savina, Alla Tarasova and MV Lyubov Orlova. The second series was: Olga Androvskaya, Olga Sadovskaya, Claudia Elanskaya and the Antonina Nezhdanoff. The vessels were used as cruise ships for Soviet and foreign tourists.

FESCO eventually acquired five of the ships: Olga Androvskaya, Olga Sadovskaya, Lyubov Orlova, Maria Savina and Antonina Nezhdanoff. Technical capabilities allowed the Antonina Nezhdanoff to go from Murmansk to her a new home port of Vladivostok along the Northern Sea Route in just 12 days.

== Technical equipment ==
Twin screw, unlimited navigation area with good driving characteristics. Seaworthy vessels have a diesel drive with two diesel engines 8M 35BF 62, manufactured in Yugoslavia, which allow a speed of over 17 knots.

== On board ==
Vessels of this class according to the project had 206 beds and 28 places for wheelchairs and are equipped with aircraft type stabilizers and air conditioning in all passenger spaces. Individual bathrooms are equipped with toilet, washbasin and shower cabins below a sofa bed, and the upper shelves were "pullman"-type beds. Ten cabins were equipped with folding children's beds. In the aft upper deck was a restaurant with 100 seats. In addition there are 2 cafes, one 40-seat bar and a café-cinema with 60 seats, a music room with a bar, dance floor and bandstand (87 seats). The public areas of the ship could additionally accommodate 327 people.

== Court project 1454 ==
The list contains the original name of the vessel, its name change is indicated in parentheses in chronological order :

Court Project 1454 The first series

- Maria Ermolova
- Maria Savina (Sampaguita Ferry 2)
- Alla Tarasova (Clipper Adventurer)
- Lyubov Orlova (Lyubov Orlova)

The second series

- Olga Androvskaya
- Olga Sadovskaya (Ocean Star)
- Claudia Elanskaya
- Antonina Nezhdanoff

== Overview ==
The list contains all the vessels of the court in a footnote indicating the original name :

Month and year of construction	Serial number	Photo	Name	First	Home port	Flag	IMO Number	Renaming and status
December 1974	406		Maria Yermolova (Мария Ермолова)	Murmansk Shipping Company	Murmansk → Novorossiysk → Astrakhan	→	7367524	SK "Caspian cruise line" (СК "Каспийская круизная линия")
July 1975	407	Maria Savina photo	Sampaguita Ferry 2	FESCO	Kholmsk → Vladivostok → Manila	→ →	7391410	* previously 'Maria Savina (Мария Савина); с 1997 Sampaguita Shipping Corp
December 1975	408		Sea Adventurer	Murmansk Shipping Company	Murmansk → Nassau	→ →	7391422	* previously Alla Tarosova (Алла Тарасова), Clipper Adventurer
19 July 1976	413		Lyubov Orlova	FESCO	Vladivostok → Avatiu	→ →	7391434	* previously Любовь Орлова(Lybovy Orlova) до 1999; Lyubov Orlova Shipping Co; судно продано на металлолом в Доминиканскую Республику. Left abandoned in St. John's due to bankruptcy of its final owner, later sold for scrap. While under tow to scrapyard, broke free. Current location unknown, believed sunk in North Atlantic.
January 1977	414	Olga Androvskaya photo	Olga Androvskaya	FESCO	Vladivostok	→ →	7422908	в 1998 году продано в Сингапур, судьба неизвестна
18 January 1977	416		Клавдия Еланская	Murmansk Shipping Company	Murmansk	→	7422922	
July 1977	415		Ocean Star	FESCO	Vladivostok	→ →	7422910	* previously Ольга Садовская (Olga Sadovskaya), 1997 operator Lindblad Travel, vessel utilized 2003
July 1978	419	Antonina Nezhdanoff photo	Antonina Nezhdanoff	FESCO	Vladivostok	→	7531852	October 20, 2004 sank in the port Fusuki (Japan) obtained as a result of the holes due to a heavy storm, the ship crashed on the pier; ship dismantled in October 2004.Wreck of Antonina Nezhdanoff photo

== See also ==
- List of cruise ships
