= MV Norsel (1945) =

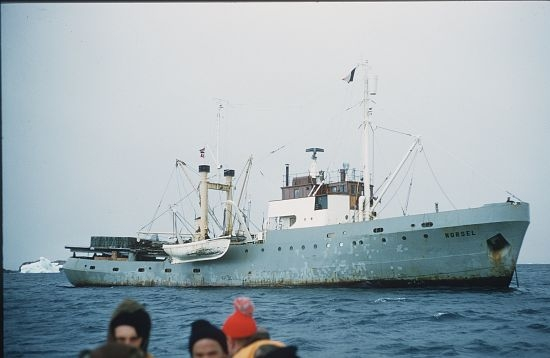
- Norsel during her service in support of the French Antarctic expeditions in the 1955–56 season

History
- Name: Lyngdalsfjord (1945–49); Norsel (1949–92)
- Owner: Kriegsmarine (1945); Nordfisk A/S (1949–79); Steinar Jakobsen (1979–89); Statens Fiskarbank (1989–90); Mathisen Fiskebåtrederi A/S (1990–91); Arktisk Marin A/S (1991–92)
- Port of registry: Tromsø, Norway
- Builder: Kaldnes Mekaniske Verksted in Tønsberg, Norway
- Yard number: 122
- Laid down: 1944
- Launched: 10 April 1945
- Completed: October 1949
- Identification: IMO number: 5256616; Code letters: LDQJ
- Fate: Wrecked south-west of Brønnøysund on 19 December 1992, and delivered for scrapping in February the following year

General characteristics
- Type: Icebreaker/Sealer/shell trawler/purse seiner
- Tonnage: 592 gross register tons (GRT)
- Length: 50.3 metres (165 ft) overall
- Beam: 9 metres (30 ft)
- Installed power: 1,080 horsepower (1949–70); 1,200 horsepower (1970–79); 3,000 horsepower (1979–92)
- Propulsion: 1 MAN 6-cylinder diesel engine (1949–70); 1 MaK diesel engine (1970–79); 1 MaK diesel engine (1979–92)

MV Norsel was a Norwegian sealing ship home ported in Tromsø. Launched during the final weeks of the Second World War as Lyngdalsfjord and only completed in late 1949, the ship sailed in both Arctic and Antarctic waters for more than 53 years until shipwrecking off the coast of Norway in 1992.

== Description ==
The 592 GRT vessel was built by Kaldnes Mekaniske Verksted in Tønsberg, Norway. She had yard number 122, and was 50.3 metres (165 ft) long overall, with a beam of 9 metres (30 ft). Her length between perpendiculars was 45 metres (148 ft). Originally intended to be powered by a steam engine, the vessel, when completed, instead had a single 1,080 horsepower MAN 6-cylinder diesel engine. In addition to the main engine, Norsel had a 35-horsepower auxiliary engine.

The ship was rebuilt at Tromsø Shipyard in 1966, having her superstructure and internal fittings replaced. Four years later, in 1970, the ship's engine was replaced with a 1,200 horsepower engine from Maschinenbau Kiel (MaK). In 1979, the ship's engine was replaced yet again, this time with a 3,000 horsepower MaK, making Norsel Norway's most powerful icebreaker. During the 1970s, Norsel was rebuilt as a shell trawler and purse seiner, while continuing in use as a sealer. Further rebuilding of the ship took place in the 1980s at Kaarbø Shipyard in Harstad, where Norsel was lengthened and equipped with a factory for the processing of shells.

== History ==
The vessel was launched as Lyngdalsfjord on 10 April 1945. Lyngdalsfjord was one of five icebreaking tugs ordered for the Kriegsmarine by the German occupiers of Norway in 1944. None of the five vessels were completed before the end of the Second World War.

The incomplete Lyngdalsfjord was bought in 1948 by the Tromsø-based polar hunting company Nordfisk A/S, and towed to Flensburg in Germany for completion as a sealing and expedition ship. The vessel was completed as Norsel in October 1949. She remained in the ownership of Nordfisk for the next 30 years. Although sold first in 1979 to Steinar Jakobsen, then in 1989 to Statens Fiskarbank, in 1990 to Mathisen Fiskebåtrederi A/S and in 1991 to Arktisk Marin A/S, she retained the name Norsel and remained home ported in Tromsø.

Norsel participated in a number of Antarctic voyages in the mid twentieth century. The first of these was with the Norwegian–British–Swedish Antarctic Expedition in 1949–52, for which Norsel did three supply voyages to the Maudheim Station in Antarctica. Amongst the equipment Norsel brought from Norway and Sweden to Maudheim was two disassembled aircraft belonging to the airline Widerøe. The ship was rented by the British Falkland Islands Department for service with the Falkland Islands Dependencies Survey in 1954–55, transporting goods to Graham Land in the British Antarctic Territory. Next, Norsel supported the French Antarctic expeditions of Paul-Émile Victor from 1955 to 1961, completing seven voyages to Adélie Land. Norsel on two occasions circumnavigated the world while operating in support of the French. In all, the ship journeyed 10 times to Antarctica in the years 1949–61.

When not employed in the Antarctic, Norsel participated in sealing off Newfoundland, catching a total of around 95,000 animals in the course of 25 hunting seasons. In the 1950s the ship was hired by the mining company Store Norske Spitsbergen Kulkompani to serve as an icebreaker in the waters off Svalbard. The Norwegian-born Colonel Bernt Balchen of the United States Air Force hired the services of Norsel for two voyages as a survey vessel for the Military Sea Transportation Service in the waters off Eastern Greenland and Iceland in the 1955–56 season. The surveys were carried out in connection with an American expansion of airbases and missile systems in the Arctic. In the 1950s and 1960s, she also served as a support vessel for the Norwegian sealers in the West Ice, and carried tourists and researchers on cruises to Svalbard. Due to her extensive service in the Arctic and Antarctic regions, Norsel was affectionately nicknamed "Polarbussen" ("the Polar Bus").

Outside of her polar work, Norsel was chartered by the British Seismographic Service and the Norwegian Directorate of Fisheries for seismic work in the North Sea and the English Channel. In the period from 1961 to 1963, Norsel was leased by the Norwegian Coast Guard, crewed by naval personnel and armed with cannon for fishery protection duties. In the latter years of her service life, Norsel supported the Norwegian shrimp trawler fleet off Svalbard as a refuelling and service ship. By late August 1972, when the ship ran aground and was damaged, Norsel had been assigned the code letters LDQJ. Some nine years later, in September 1981, Norsel was damaged in an accidental collision with another vessel.

Norsel ran aground off the coast of Helgeland, south-west of Brønnøysund, Norway (65°24′N 11°58′E) on 19 December 1992. Damaged beyond repair, the ship was delivered to a breaker's yard in Molde, Norway, in February 1993.

== Legacy ==
In connection with the Norwegian–British–Swedish Antarctic Expedition, the iceport Norselbukta on the Quar Ice Shelf in Queen Maud Land was named after Norsel. Norsel Point, near Arthur Harbour in the British Antarctic Territory was named after the vessel following Norsel's work on behalf of the Falkland Islands Dependencies Survey in 1954–55. The road Norselvegen in Tromsdalen, Tromsø is also named after the ship.

Norsel appeared on a f7.30 postage stamp of the French Antarctic Territory in 1981 and on a 10p stamp of the British Antarctic Territory in 1993.
