= Kapitan Khlebnikov =

Russian (formerly Soviet) icebreaker

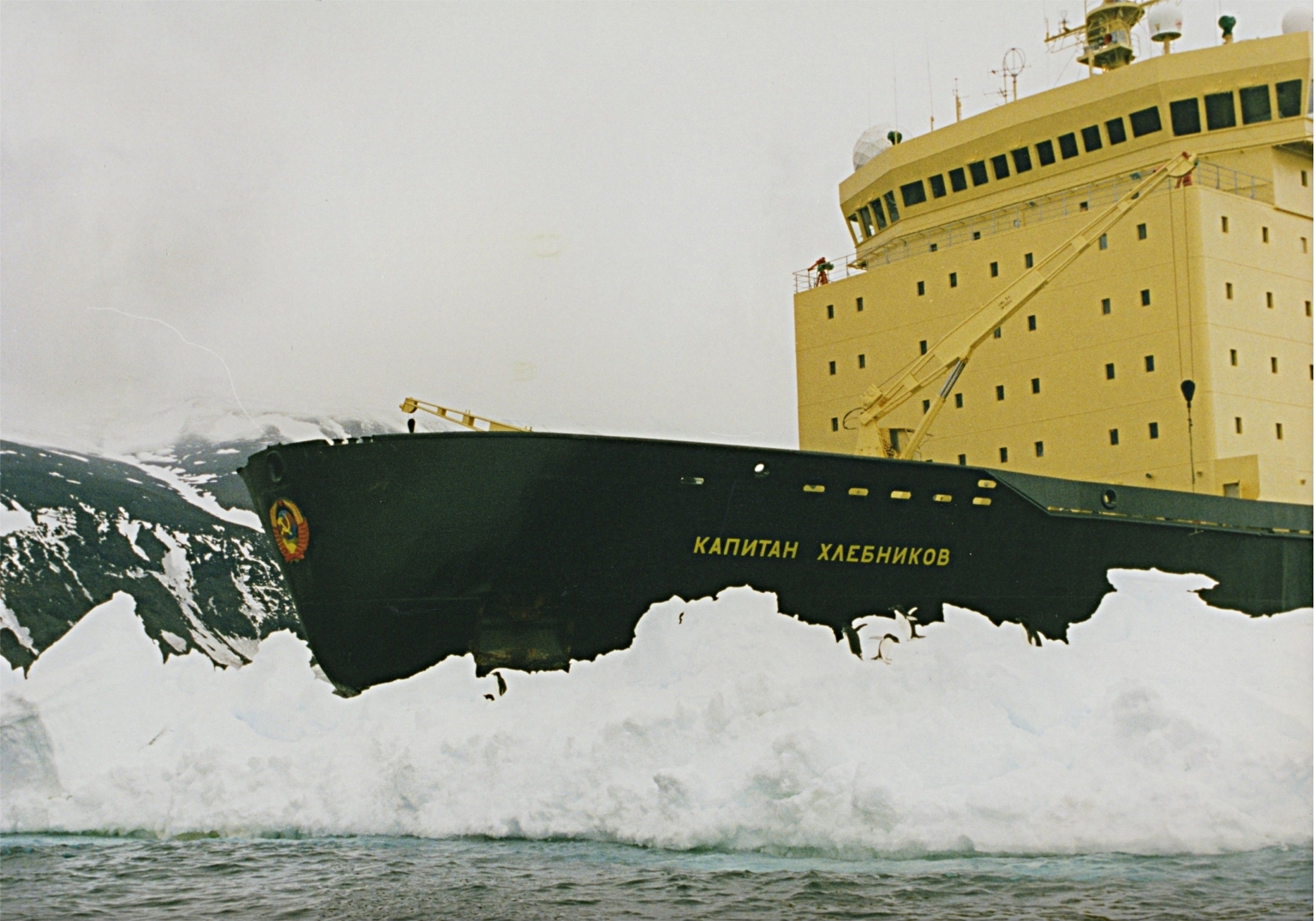
- Kapitan Khlebnikov and penguins in the Ross Sea, Antarctica.

History

Russia
- Name: Kapitan Khlebnikov
- Namesake: Yury Khlebnikov (1900–1976)
- Owner: Far East Shipping Company; Manager: International Shipping Partners
- Operator: Quark Expeditions
- Route: Arctic and Antarctic cruising
- Builder: Wärtsilä Helsinki shipyard, Finland
- Launched: 1981
- Home port: Vladivostok
- Identification: IMO number: 7824417; MMSI number: 273146110; Callsign: UGSE
- Status: In active service

General characteristics
- Class & type: Kapitan Sorokin-class icebreaker
- Displacement: 12,288 tons
- Length: 122.50 m (401 ft 11 in)
- Beam: 26.50 m (86 ft 11 in)
- Draught: 8.50 m (27 ft 11 in)
- Ice class: KM* LL3 [2] А2 passenger
- Installed power: Main engines: 6 diesel sets producing 24,200 hp (18.0 MW)
- Propulsion: 3 twin DC electric motors each turning a 22 m (72 ft) long propeller shaft to which is attached a 4 bladed 4.3 m diameter propeller with hardened steel blades. Blades can be changed at sea in the event of damage.
- Speed: 14 knots (26 km/h; 16 mph) in open water; Max speed: 19 knots (35 km/h; 22 mph)
- Capacity: Guests: 108
- Complement: 70
- Aircraft carried: Two helicopters are carried to help with navigation in ice and for tourist trips.
- Aviation facilities: Hangars

Kapitan Khlebnikov (Russian: Капита́н Хле́бников, IPA: [kəpʲɪˈtan ˈxlʲɛbnʲɪkəf]) is a Russian (formerly Soviet) icebreaker.

The vessel has also previously operated as a cruise ship offering excursions to the Arctic and Antarctic.

== History ==
The Kapitan Khlebnikov was completed in Finland in 1981 as one of four Kapitan Sorokin-class icebreakers. She was refitted in 1990 as a tour ship and was the first ship to circumnavigate Antarctica with passengers in 1996–97.

In February 2006 the Kapitan Khlebnikov reached the Bay of Whales in the Antarctic, reaching 78° 40.871' south and equalling the record set by Roald Amundsen in the Fram in 1911.

== Construction and layout ==
Icebreaker Kapitan Khlebnikov in the Ross Sea

A polar-class icebreaker, combining power and technology with creature comforts, Kapitan Khlebnikov was originally designed for the rigors of the Arctic Ocean. The vessel has twin decks with superstructure and engine room in the middle, an icebreaker bow and transom stern. The stern region is cushioned to allow for the close towing of other vessels when helping them through the ice.

Passenger accommodation is in 54 cabins and suites, with 2 dining rooms, a lounge and bar. Facilities include a heated indoor swimming pool, exercise room and sauna, theatre-style auditorium and shop. The library has a collection of polar-themed books.

The double hull has water ballast between, with pumps that can move ballast water at up to 74 tonnes a minute to aid ice breaking. The hull thickness is 45 millimetres (1.8 in) at the ice skirt and 25–35 millimetres (0.98–1.38 in) elsewhere. Friction between the ship and the ice is reduced by a polymer-paint coating at the level of the ice skirt. An air bubbling system helps ice breaking. Air can be forced under pressure from 2 metres (6 ft 7 in) above the keel from the bow to halfway down the ship.

== Service ==
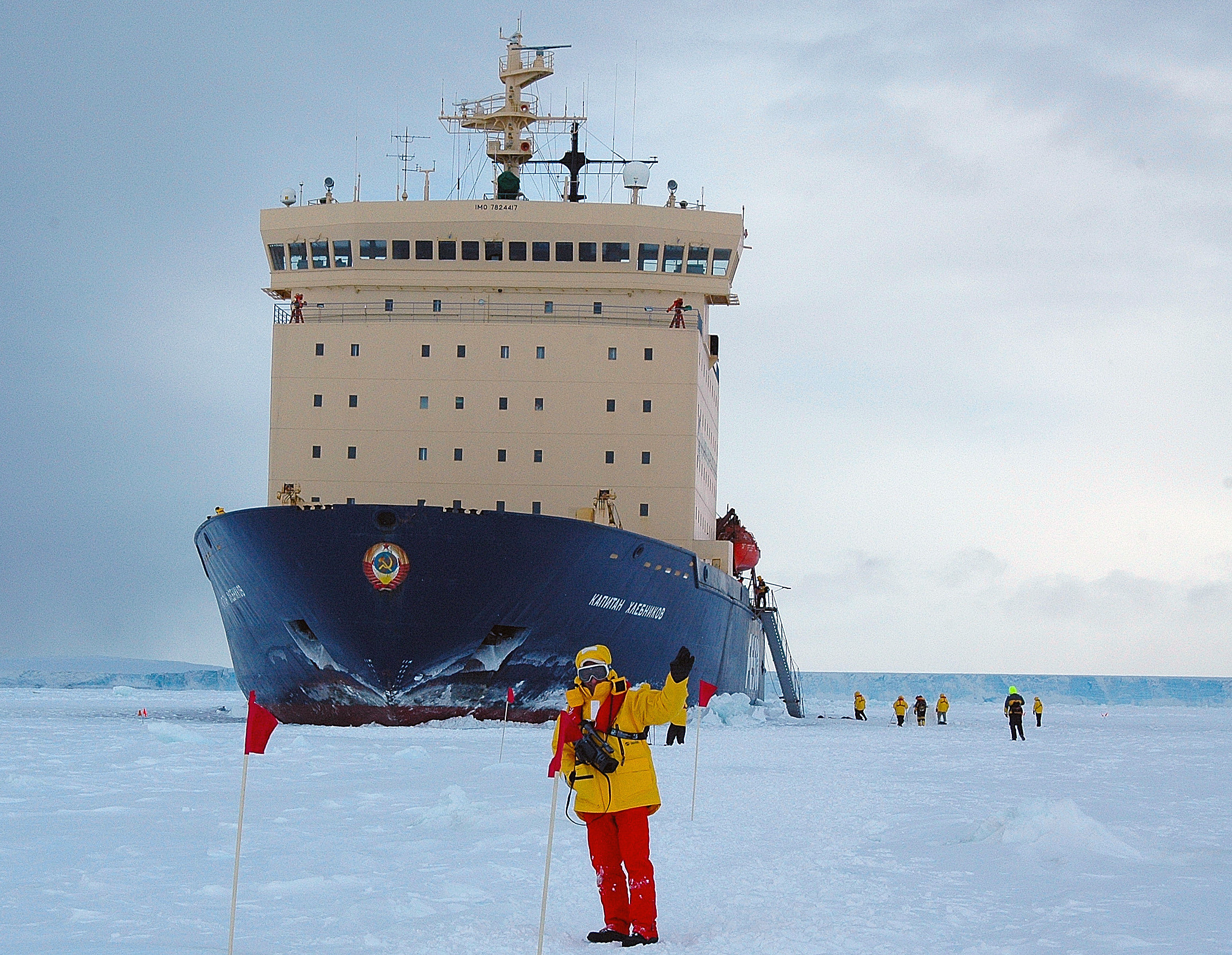
Kapitan Khlebnikov in the Arctic

In addition to charters for scientific missions, and for supplying mines and other resource exploitation industries, the vessel is chartered for adventure cruises.

== Stuck in the ice ==
In November 2009, the vessel was trapped in Antarctic ice in a bay near to Snow Hill Island. The Guardian reports that 101 passengers, mainly United Kingdom citizens, were among the 184 aboard the trapped ship. The excursion was called the "Emperor Penguin Safari", and was arranged by an adventure travel firm called Exodus. Three of the UK passengers were a BBC film crew, working on a documentary, entitled Frozen Planet. The ship was placed a few days behind schedule but not endangered.

== See also ==
She is one of four large icebreakers operated by the Far East Shipping Company, alongside:

- Icebreaker Admiral Makarov
- Icebreaker Magadan
- Icebreaker Krasin
