= Antarctic sea ice =

Sea ice of the Southern Ocean

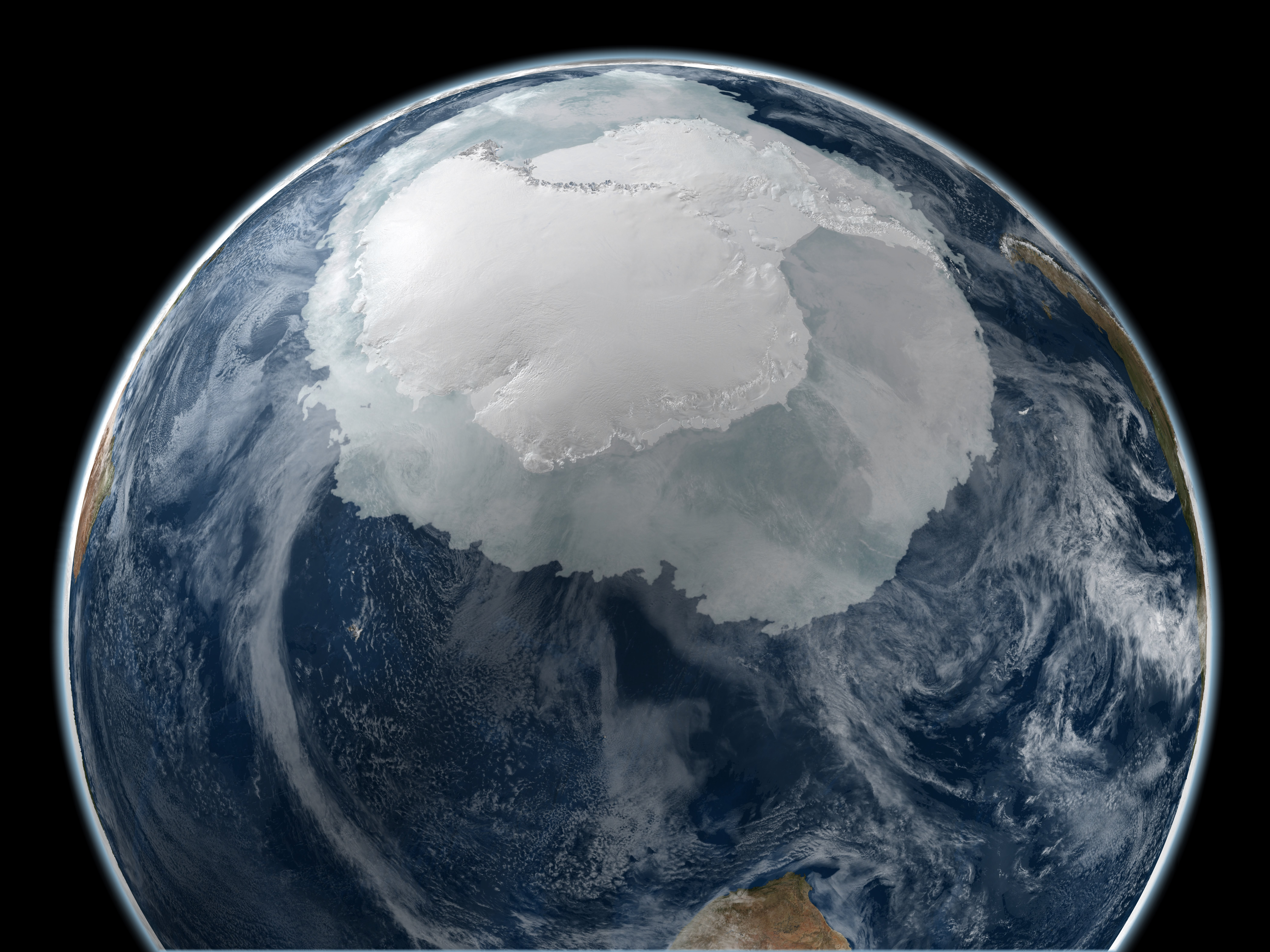
Earth image on September 21, 2005, with the full Antarctic region visible

Antarctic sea ice is the sea ice of the Southern Ocean. It extends from the far north in the winter and retreats to almost the coastline every summer. Sea ice is frozen seawater that is usually less than a few meters thick. This is the opposite of ice shelves, which are formed by glaciers; they float in the sea, and are up to a kilometre thick. There are two subdivisions of sea ice: fast ice, which are attached to land; and ice floes, which are not.

Sea ice that comes from the Southern Ocean melts from the bottom instead of the surface like Arctic ice because it is covered in snow on top. As a result, melt ponds are rarely observed. On average, Antarctic sea ice is younger, thinner, warmer, saltier, and more mobile than Arctic sea ice. Another difference between the two ice packs is that while there is clear Arctic sea ice decline, the trend in Antarctica is roughly flat. Antarctic sea ice is not studied very well in comparison to Arctic ice since it is less accessible.

== Measurements of sea ice ==
=== Extent ===
The Antarctic sea ice cover is highly seasonal, with very little ice in the austral summer, expanding to an area roughly equal to that of Antarctica in winter. It peaks (~18 × 10^6 km^{2}) during September (comparable to the surface area of Pluto), which marks the end of austral winter, and retreats to a minimum (~3 × 10^6 km^{2}) in February. Consequently, most Antarctic sea ice is first year ice, a few meters thick, but the exact thickness is not known. The area of 18 million km^2 of ice is 18 trillion square meters, so for each meter of thickness, given that the density of ice is about 0.88 teratonnes/million km^3, the mass of the top meter of Antarctic sea ice is roughly 16 teratonnes (trillion metric tons) in late winter. Record low summer sea ice was measured in February 2022 at 741,000 square miles (1.9 million square kilometers) by the National Snow and Ice Data Center.

Since the ocean off the Antarctic coast usually is much warmer than the air above it, the extent of the sea ice is largely controlled by the winds and currents that push it northwards. If it is pushed quickly, the ice can travel much further north before it melts. Most ice is formed along the coast, as the northward-moving ice leaves areas of open water (coastal latent-heat polynyas), which rapidly freeze.

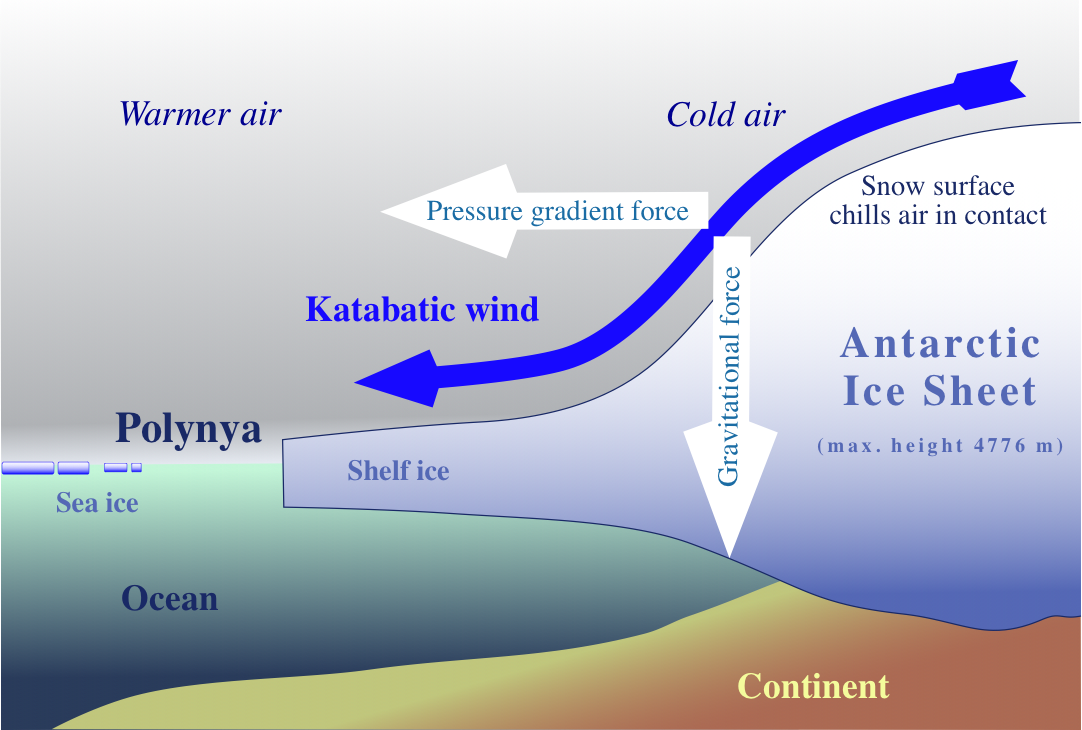

=== Thickness ===
Because Antarctic ice is mainly first-year ice, which is not as thick as multiyear ice, it is generally less than a few meters thick. Snowfall and flooding of the ice can thicken it substantially, and the layer structure of Antarctic ice is often quite complex.

== Recent trends and climate change ==
Sea ice extent in Antarctica varies a lot year by year. This makes it difficult determine a trend, and record highs and record lows have been observed between 2013 and 2023. The general trend since November 1978, the start of the satellite measurements, has been roughly flat, with two distinct change points. From November 1978 to August 2007, the mean sea ice extent anomaly was close to zero. This was followed by a period of positive anomalies from September 2007 to August 2016, and a subsequent shift to predominantly negative anomalies that continues to the present. Statistical analyses show that the Antarctic sea ice system has undergone a structural change that is indicative of a regime shift in the system's behaviour. The decline in Antarctic sea ice since 2016 has been accompanied by increased upper ocean heat content, suggesting an oceanic influence on the observed loss. This reduction in sea ice appears to be primarily driven by thermodynamic processes, rather than by mechanical advection. One such possible contributing factor is a persistent zonal wave number 3 pattern that was present from early winter through spring, since it indicates enhanced meridional flow.

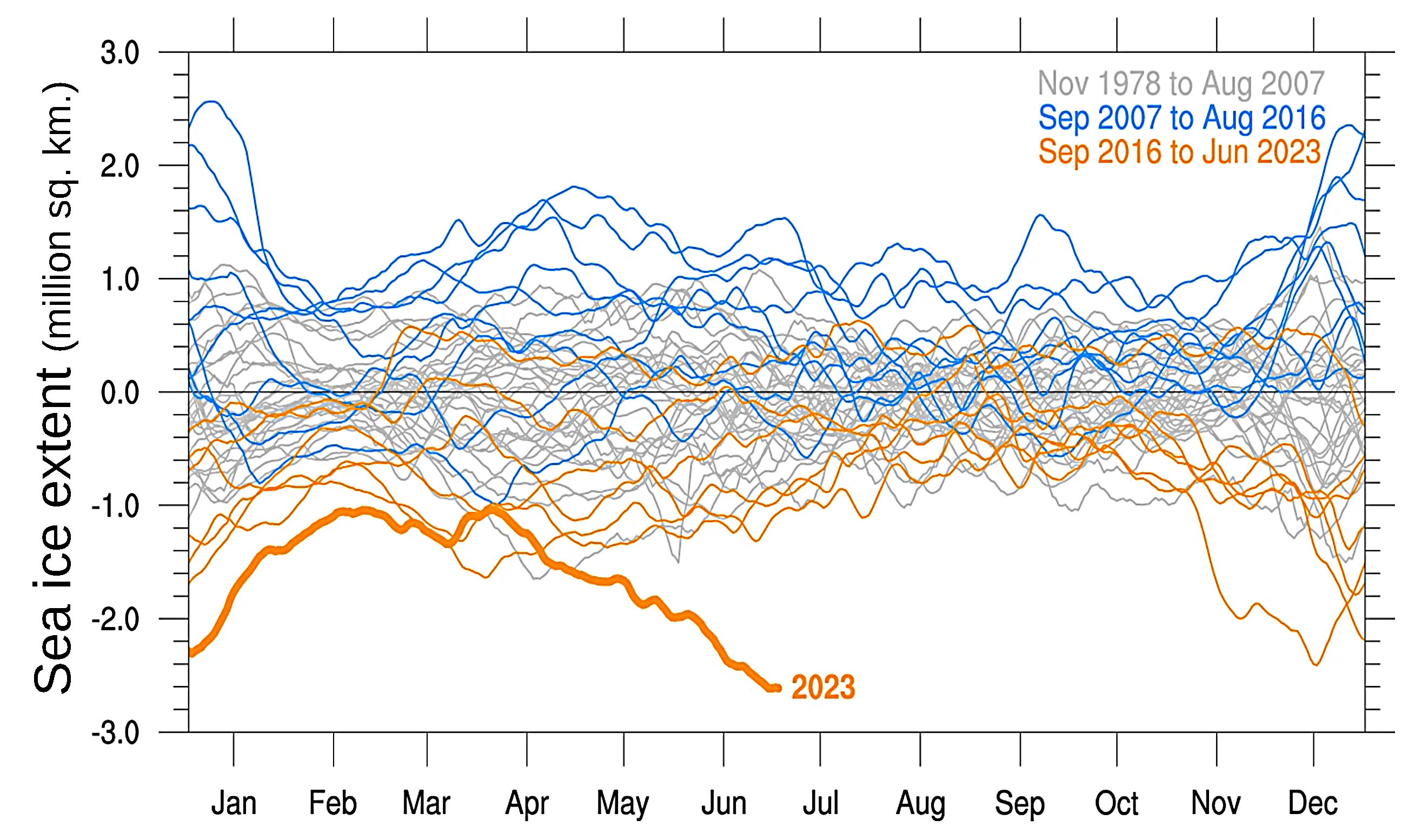
Reporting reducing Antarctic sea ice extent in mid 2023, researchers concluded that a "regime shift" may be taking place "in which previously important relationships no longer dominate sea ice variability".

The extent (area) of Antarctic sea ice reached a new low in 2023. Chart shows how little sea ice remains in the Antarctic summer, which at one point in February 2023 was only about 60% of its 1981-2010 average.

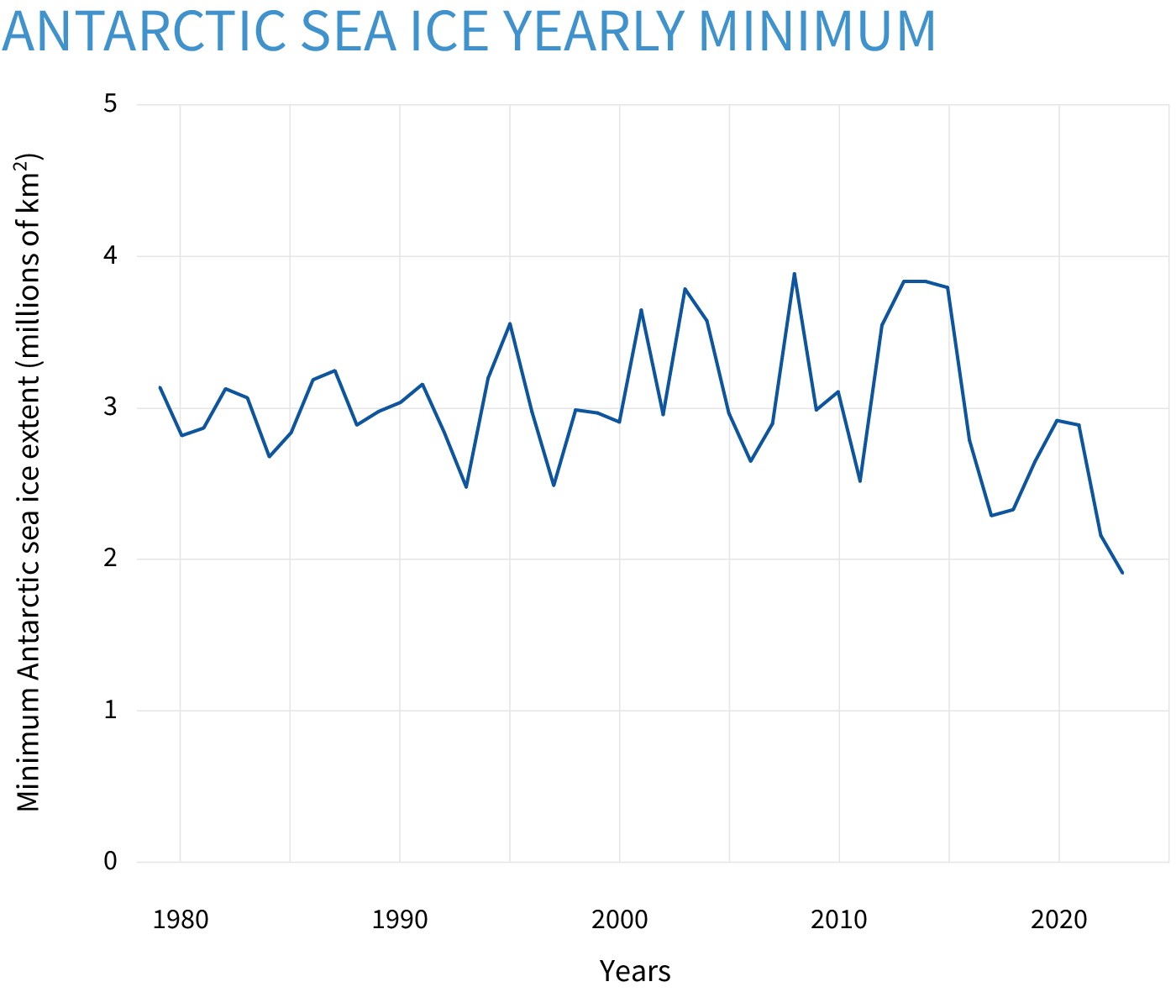
Antarctic sea ice cover shrinks to its minimum extent each year in February or March; the ice cover then grows until reaching its maximum extent in September or October.

An animation of the Antarctic sea ice growing from its seasonal minimum to seasonal maximum extent during southern hemisphere autumn and winter (between March 21 and September 19, 2014; note labels on animation). Spring melting in not shown.

The IPCC AR5 report concluded that "it is very likely" that annual mean Antarctic sea ice extent increased 1.2 to 1.8% per decade, which is 0.13 to 0.20 million km^{2} per decade, during the period 1979 to 2012. IPCC AR5 also concluded that the lack of data precludes determining the trend in total volume or mass of the sea ice. The increase in sea ice area probably has a number of causes. These are tied to changes in the southern hemispheric westerly winds, which are a combination of natural variability and forced change from greenhouse gases and the ozone hole. The winds drive sea ice drift, and modelling research suggests that the observed sea ice expansion was driven by changes in the sea ice drift velocity. Another possible driver is ice-shelves melting, which increases freshwater input to the ocean; this increases the weakly stratified ocean surface layer and so reduces the ability of warm subsurface water to reach the surface. A 2015 study found this effect in climate models run to simulate future climate change, resulting in an increase of sea ice in the winter months.

Recent changes in wind patterns, which are connected to regional changes in the number of extratropical cyclones and anticyclones, around Antarctica have advected the sea ice farther north in some areas and not as far north in others.

Atmospheric and oceanic drivers likely have contributed to the formation of regionally varying trends in Antarctic sea-ice extent. For example, temperatures in the atmosphere and Southern Ocean have increased during the period 1979–2004. However, sea ice grows faster than it melts, because of a weakly stratified ocean. Thus, this oceanic mechanism is, among others, contributing to an increase in the net ice production, potentially resulting in more sea ice. Although thickness observations are limited, modelling suggests that observed ice-drift toward the coastal regions makes an additional contribution for dynamical sea-ice thickening during autumn and winter.

Observed autumn and spring trends in the number of extratropical cyclones, anticyclones and blocks, which have a strong thermodynamic control through temperature advection, and a strong dynamic control through ice-drift, on sea-ice extent during the same and also during following seasons are almost everywhere around Antarctica in agreement with the observed, regionally varying, trends in sea-ice extent. Consequently, the near-surface winds steered around weather systems are thought to explain large parts of the inhomogeneous Antarctica sea-ice trends.

The 2021 IPCC AR6 report confirms the observed increasing trend in the mean Antarctic sea ice area over the period from 1979 to 2014 but assesses that there was a decline after 2014, with the least extent reached in 2017, and a following growth. The report then concludes that there is "high confidence" that there is no significant trend in the satellite observed Antarctic sea ice area from 1979 to 2020 in both winter and summer.

In early January 2023, the National Snow and Ice Data Center reported that Antarctic sea ice extent stood at the lowest in the 45-year satellite record—more than 500,000 square kilometers (193,000 square miles) below the previous record (2018), with four of the five lowest years for the last half of December having occurred since 2016.

In September 2023, Antarctic sea ice reached a record low winter maximum extent of 16.96 million square kilometers, nearly one million square kilometers less than the previous record set in 1986. While slight net increases in some isolated years or increases in ice shelves are sometimes reported, this does not contradict the net decrease the Antarctic sea ice has undergone for decades.

Mass change of ice in Antarctica, 2002-2023

=== Implications ===
Monitoring changes in sea ice is important as this impacts the psychrophiles that live here.

Changes in Antarctic sea ice are also important because of implications for atmospheric and oceanic circulation. When sea ice forms, it rejects salt (ocean water is saline but sea ice is largely fresh) so dense salty water is formed which sinks and plays a key role in formation of Antarctic Bottom Water.

== Effects on navigation ==
[T]he greatest part of this southern continent (supposing there is one), must lie within the polar circle, where the sea is so pestered with ice, that the land is thereby inaccessible.

— Captain James Cook. A Voyage Towards the South Pole and Round the World, etc.

The force of moving ice is considerable; it can crush ships that are caught in the ice pack, and severely limits the areas where ships can reach the land, even in summer. Icebreakers, iceports and ice piers are used to land supplies.

== See also ==
- Arctic sea ice decline
- Antarctic ice sheet
