= Harbor =

Sheltered body of water for mooring

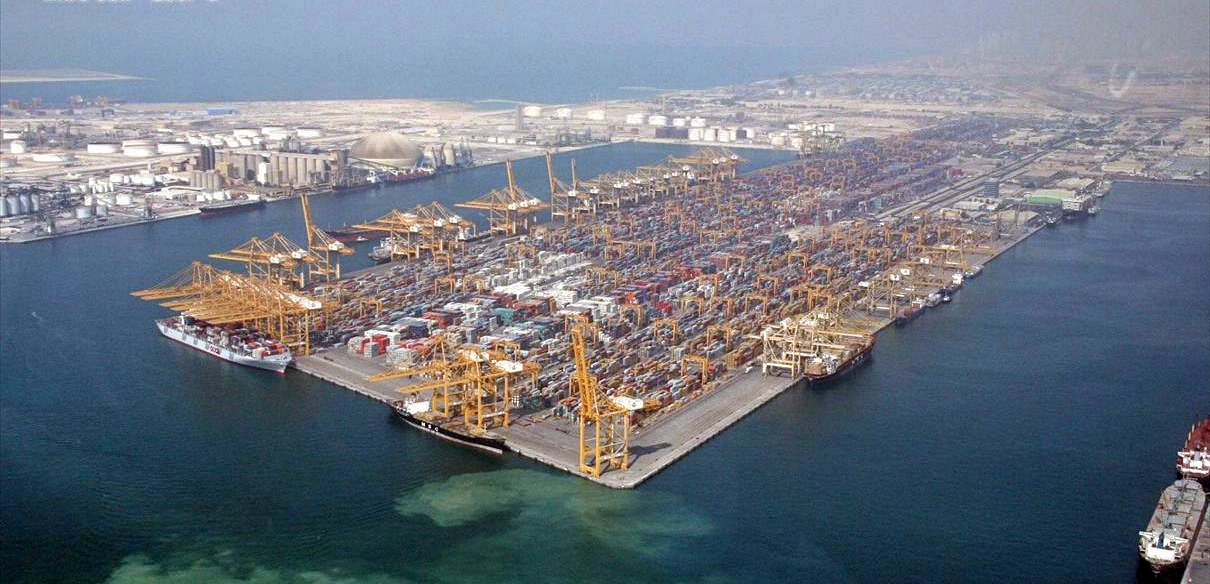
Port of Jebel Ali, which has the largest artificial harbor in the world.

A harbor (American English) or harbour (Commonwealth English) is a sheltered part of a body of water where ships, boats, and barges can be moored.

The term harbor is often used interchangeably with port; however, port refers specifically to the facilities for loading and unloading ships, as opposed to just a sheltered area of water. For example, Alexandria Port in Egypt is a port with two harbors.

Harbors may be natural or artificial. An artificial harbor can have breakwaters, sea walls, or jetties, or they can be constructed by dredging, which requires maintenance by further periodic dredging. An example of an artificial harbor is Long Beach Harbor, California, United States, which was previously an array of salt marshes and tidal flats too shallow for modern merchant ships before it was first dredged in the early 20th century. In contrast, a natural harbor is surrounded on several sides by naturally-occurring land. Examples of natural harbors include Victoria Harbour in Hong Kong, Sydney Harbour in New South Wales, Australia, Halifax Harbour in Nova Scotia, Canada, and Trincomalee Harbour in Sri Lanka.

== Types ==
=== Artificial harbors ===
Artificial harbors are frequently built for use as ports. The oldest artificial harbor known is the Ancient Egyptian site at Wadi al-Jarf, on the Red Sea coast, which is at least 4500 years old (ca. 2600–2550 BCE, reign of King Khufu). The largest artificially created harbor is Jebel Ali in Dubai. The Ancient Carthaginians constructed fortified, artificial harbors called cothons.

=== Natural ===
A natural harbor is a landform where a section of a body of water is protected and deep enough to allow anchorage. Many such harbors are rias. Natural harbors have long been of great strategic naval and economic importance, and many great cities of the world are located on them. Having a protected harbor reduces or eliminates the need for breakwaters as it will result in calmer waves inside the harbor.

=== Ice-free ===
For harbors near the North and South poles, being ice-free is an important advantage, especially when it is year-round.

The world's southernmost harbor, located at Antarctica's Winter Quarters Bay (77° 50′ South), is sometimes ice-free, depending on the summertime pack ice conditions.

== See also ==
- Boyd's Automatic tide signalling apparatus
- Dock
- Ice pier
- Inland harbor
- List of marinas
- List of deepest natural harbours
- List of seaports
- Mandracchio
- Marina
- Mulberry harbour
- Roadstead
- Seaport
- Shipyard
- Wharf
