= Winter Quarters Bay =

Bay in Antarctica

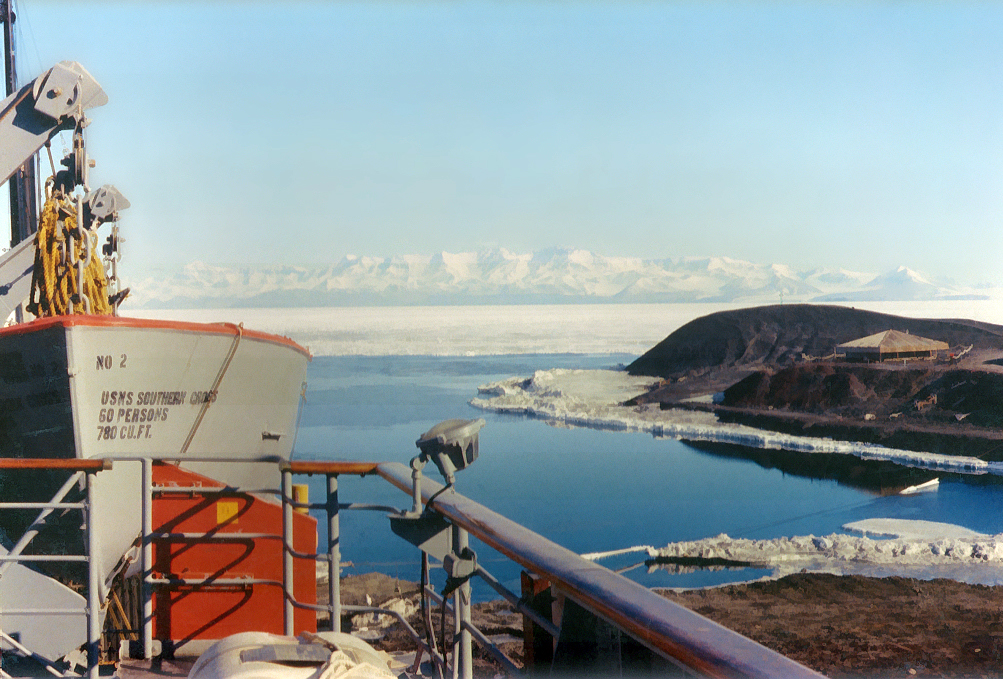
Winter Quarters Bay's use as a seaport began in 1901 with Robert F. Scott's Discovery Expedition, with a hut as seen in early 1980s from a ship in Winter Quarters Bay.

Winter Quarters Bay is a small cove of McMurdo Sound, Antarctica, located 2,200 miles (3,500 km) due south of New Zealand at 77°50'S. The harbor is the southernmost port in the world and features a floating ice pier for summer cargo operations. The bay is approximately 250m wide and long, with a maximum depth of 33m. The name Winter Quarters Bay refers to Robert Falcon Scott's National Antarctic Discovery Expedition (1901–04) which wintered at the site for two seasons.

A small peninsula on the southern tip of Ross Island forms the natural harbor at Winters Quarters Bay which offers shelter for ships. The harbor has served the few ships able to penetrate McMurdo Sound's 8 to 12 ft (2.4 to 3.7 m) pack ice ever since the Discovery Expedition (1901–04).

Today, two ships assisted by an icebreaker annually arrive at Winter Quarters Bay with fuel and cargo to re-supply the adjacent U.S. McMurdo Station at 77°50′S 166°40′E. The cargo operations also support nearby Scott Base and field stations throughout Antarctica. More than 50 years of activity at McMurdo Station has severely polluted the bay.

== Bay water characteristics ==
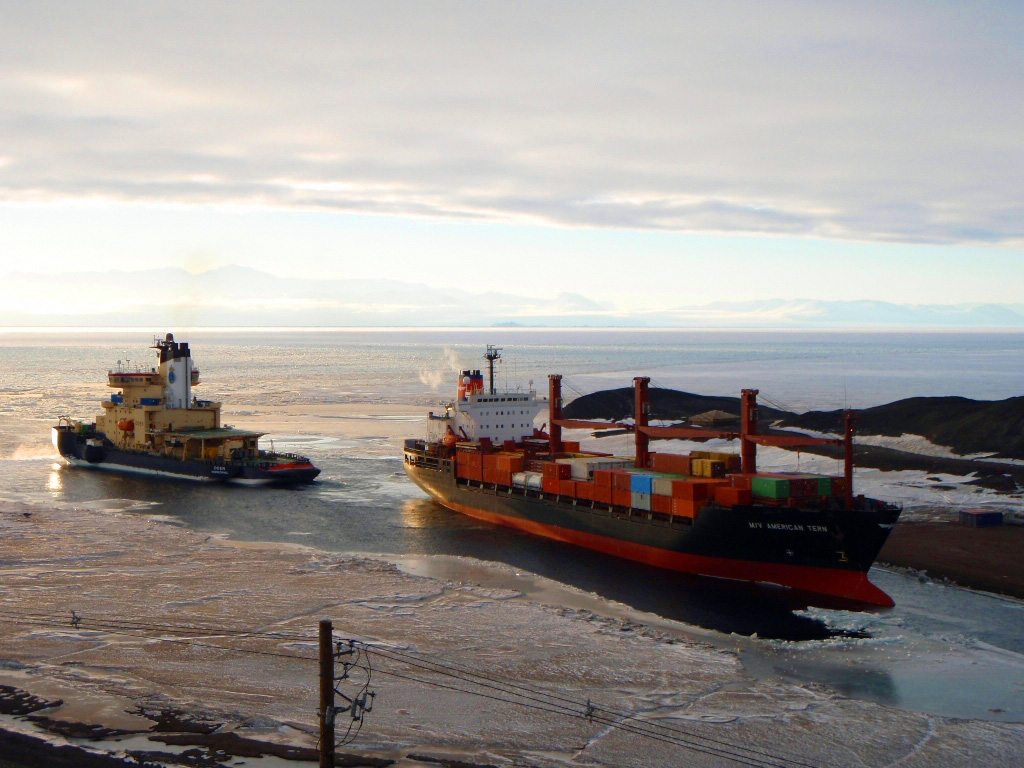
Swedish Icebreaker Oden helps the chartered cargo ship M/V American Tern depart McMurdo (Early 2008)

A shallow submarine ridge marks the mouth of Winter Quarters Bay. Water depths in the bay range from 13m along the ridge to a maximum depth of 33m at the bay's center.

The submarine ridge and Hut Point Peninusula temper the effect of McMurdo Sound ocean currents. Current meters indicate such minimal currents that the bay can be considered essentially stagnant. In addition the submarine ridge tends to provide a buffer against icebergs moving into the bay and damaging the ice pier and shoreline. Physical barriers created by such land forms have also concentrated toxic pollutants introduced into the bay from operations at McMurdo Station, according to a 1997 U.S. National Science Foundation sponsored study.

The combination of sun and sufficiently warm air temperatures a few days during midsummer can produce snowmelt on adjacent Ross Island. The subsequent runoff is largely diverted by ditches and culverts into McMurdo Sound, rather than the bay, according to the National Science Foundation report.

== Harbor pollution ==
Scientific and support operations at McMurdo Station, beginning with its construction in 1955, have led to severely polluted waters at Winter Quarters Bay. Until 1981, McMurdo Station residents simply towed their garbage out to the sea ice and let nature take its course. The garbage sunk to the sea floor when the ice broke up in the spring, according to news reports.

A 2001 survey of the seabed at Winter Quarters Bay revealed 15 vehicles, 26 shipping containers, and 603 fuel drums, as well as some 1,000 miscellaneous items dumped on an area of some 50 acres (0.20 square kilometres). Findings by scuba divers were reported in the State of the Environment Report, a New Zealand sponsored study.

In addition, sediments in the bay are contaminated with PCBs, metals, and hydrocarbon fuels. A January 2005 edition of the Antarctic Sun, a U.S. National Science Foundation publication, noted that a former landfill located on a hill above the bay is considered to have been a primary source of the fuel and PCB contaminants. PCBs, now banned in the United States, were used in electrical and heating systems. A 1990 study found that PCBs in the water were also produced by marine shop wastes and ships pumping their bilges while docked.

The Antarctic Sun quoted a professor of developmental and cancer biology at the University of Auckland as saying "the bay has one of the highest toxic concentrations of any body of water on Earth."

== Turning basin ==
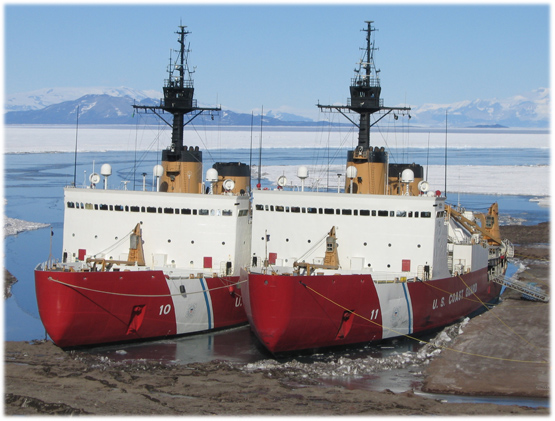
Polar Star and Polar Sea icebreakers moored at Winter Quarters Bay

Port officials deploy one or more icebreakers each summer, depending upon ice conditions, to cut a circular basin just off Winter Quarters Bay. The basin provides an open area for the cargo ships to depart the ice pier, swing north, and proceed into a ship channel through McMurdo Sound. The channel is opened up by icebreakers annually and can range from 8 to 50 nautical miles (93 km) in length.

== History ==
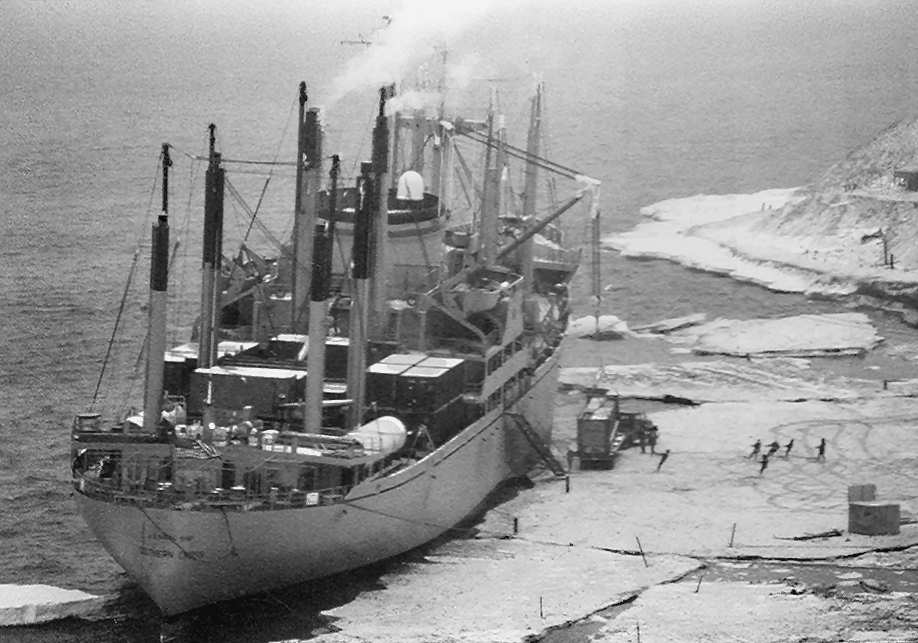
Severe cracks in an ice pier in use for four seasons at McMurdo Station slowed cargo operations in 1983 and proved a safety hazard.

Robert Falcon Scott chose Winter Quarters Bay to winter over during his National Antarctic Discovery Expedition (1901–1904). The expedition vessel, RRS Discovery, was ice-locked in the harbour for two years before being freed by explosives on February 14, 1904.

The expedition included explorers Scott, Edward Wilson, and Ernest Shackleton's first major attempt to reach the South Pole. The explorers travelled overland to 82°S before turning back. The expedition erected a prefabricated hut at Hut Point overlooking the bay. The hut remains today and is protected as an historic site by the Antarctic Heritage Trust (New Zealand).

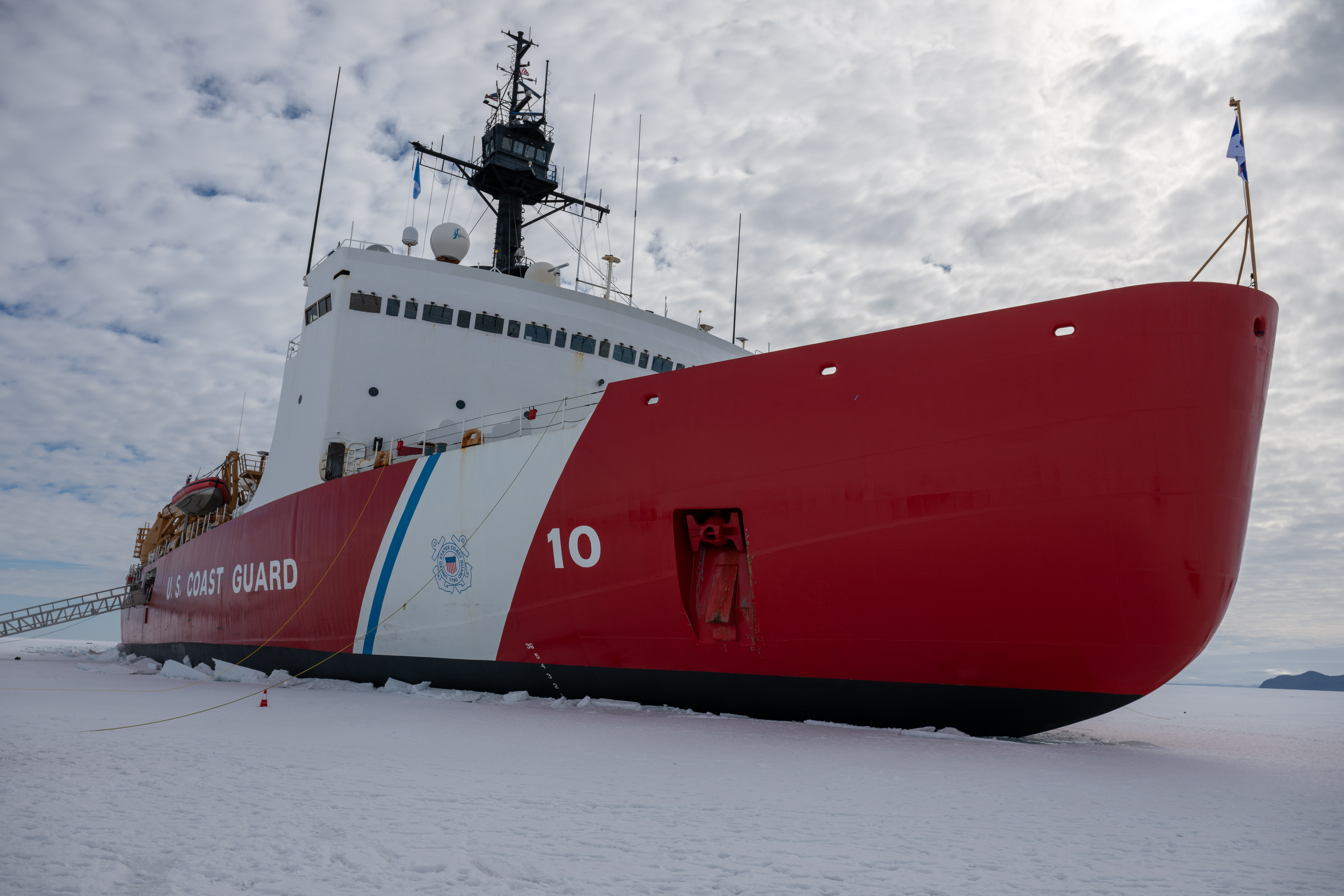
USCGC Polar Star (WAGB 10) in McMurdo Sound for Operation Deep Freeze. January 7, 2025

Vince's Cross, a wooden cross erected in 1902 to honour Seaman George T. Vince who drowned nearby is located immediately above the hut on a small knoll overlooking the bay at Hut Point. Our Lady of the Snows Shrine, a Madonna statue honouring Richard T. Williams, a Seabee tractor driver who drowned in 1956, is also nearby. McMurdo Station's Williams Field is named after the sailor. Moreover, officials erected another monument on the knoll to commemorate Raymond T. Smith, a Navy petty officer killed at Winter Quarters Bay during cargo operations aboard the USNS Southern Cross in February 1982.

== See also ==
- Ice pier
- McMurdo Sound
- McMurdo Station
- Operation Deep Freeze
- Scott Base
- McMurdo Station transportation
