= Kaldnes Mekaniske Verksted =

Kaldnes Mekaniske Verksted was a Norwegian manufacturing company, best known for its shipyard.

It was founded in 1899, and was engaged in shipbuilding until 1992. The company continued as a manufacturer of large forklift trucks until 2001. The former shipyard district at Kaldnes in Tønsberg was then built up with waterfront housing from 2002.
