= Quark Expeditions =

American travel company

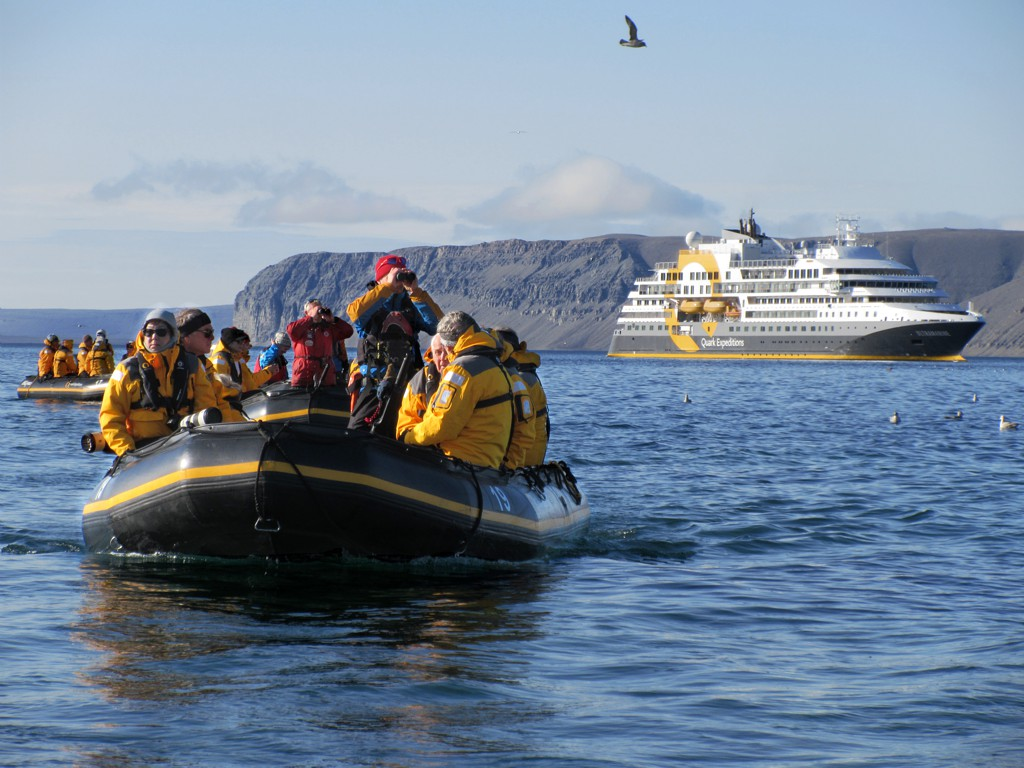
- Quark Expeditions first purpose built ship, 'Ultramarine'
- Founded: 1991
- Headquarters: Seattle, Washington (U.S.; 2017 data)
- Services: Polar Expeditions; Polar Cruises; Adventure Travel; North Pole Travel; Passenger Transportation
- Parent: Travelopia
- Website: www.quarkexpeditions.com

Quark Expeditions is a polar travel company headquartered in Seattle, Washington that offers small-ship expedition cruises aboard expedition ships and icebreakers in the Arctic and Antarctica. The company is a subsidiary of the UK-based travel group Travelopia and conducts seasonal itineraries in both polar regions aboard ice-class vessels.

== History ==
As of 2025, Quark Expeditions, a travel company, was headquartered in Seattle, Washington. Quark Expeditions was founded in 1985 by Mike McDowell following his departure from Salen Lindblad when he commenced operating an eclectic group of travel experiences including Indonesian dive and cultural trips, South Pole lead fly in trips amongst other things but always with a view to return to Antarctica.

In 1990–1991, McDowell chartered the MV Frontier Spirit during its inaugural season of operations for several voyages to Antarctica from Hobart, Australia and Bluff, New Zealand. After these voyages, Mike McDowell partnered with Lars Wikander.

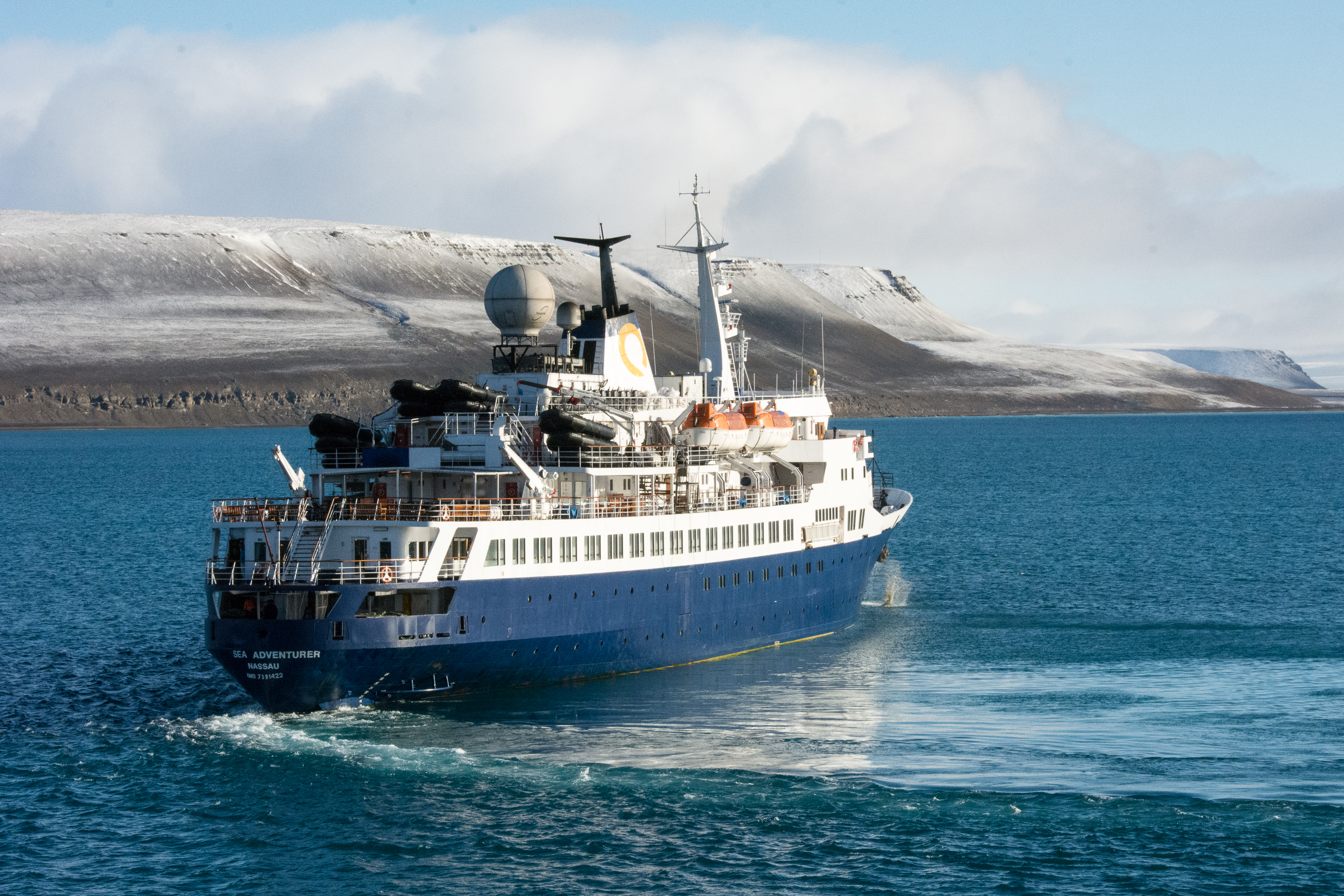
Quark Expeditions ship, Sea Adventurer, at Griffin Inlet, Beechey Island, Nunavut, Canada

In 1998, McDowell sold his interests to Lars Wikander, who then became the company's majority owner. Three years later, Patrick Shaw joined the company as president and CEO, and Wikander moved to become chairman of the board.

In May 2007, the company became part of the UK-based TUI Travel group of companies; subsequently, in 2016, it became part of Travelopia, a division comprising some brands from the former TUI Specialist Group.

In 2012, the company reported via a trade publication that it would offer the first "carbon-neutral" polar expeditions, offsetting the carbon emissions of its vessel, Ocean Diamond. The former roll-on/roll-off vessel uses Bunker C heavy-duty oil, and one voyage produces an estimated 5,682 tons of CO_{2}. The tour operator reported that it had signed a contract with the certifier The CarbonNeutral Company.

In 2016, the company mounted an Arctic expedition for the purpose of creating a YouTube film, a trip that included internet personalities and YouTube creators Ben Brown (the filmmaker) and Tim Kellner, as well as presenter Tom Scott and expedition-lead, the retired Canadian astronaut, Chris Hadfield. The company's summer 2019 program in the Arctic included sailings to "Greenland, Canada's High Arctic, the Northwest Passage and the North Pole".

In April 2021, Quark took delivery of the "199-guest" vessel, Ultramarine, a product of the Brodosplit shipyard in Split, Croatia. its first solely owned ship.

== Operations by region ==
Quark Expeditions operates voyages in both the Arctic and Antarctic, with itineraries varying seasonally between the two polar regions.

=== Arctic ===
Quark Expeditions operates cruises in the Arctic during the Northern Hemisphere summer, with destinations including Greenland, Svalbard, Iceland, and Canada's High Arctic, as well as transits of the Northwest Passage. These voyages typically emphasize Arctic wildlife such as polar bears, walruses, and migratory bird species, as well as cultural interactions with Indigenous communities in Greenland and Nunavut.

Some of the company's early operations in the Arctic included commercial voyages through the Northeast Passage and expeditions to the North Pole aboard Russian nuclear icebreakers, which were among the first consumer-focused trips of their kind.

=== Antarctic ===
Quark's Antarctic season generally runs from November to March, with departures from Ushuaia, Argentina across the Drake Passage to the Antarctic Peninsula. Some itineraries include voyages to the South Georgia Islands, the Falkland Islands, Snow Hill Island, Patagonia, and the Weddell Sea. The company has operated both small expedition vessels and larger chartered ships in the region, including voyages aboard the icebreaker Kapitan Khlebnikov and purpose-built expedition ships such as Ultramarine.

== Safety incidents ==
As of February 8, 2023, The United States Coast Guard was investigating the death of two Americans after the capsize of an inflatable zodiac boat operating off of the World Explorer passenger ship, operated by Quark Expeditions under a Portuguese flag. The incident occurred off of Antarctica’s Elephant Island, and the conditions were described by a Quark Expeditions spokesperson as being "light winds and [a] smooth sea state", with the accident having been caused by "a breaking wave". The U.S. Coast Guard is involved in the investigation under international maritime law, as the U.S. is a "substantially interested state".

On March 26, 2025, Quark Expedition's Ocean Explorer encountered waves estimated to have been 35–40 feet during a return leg to Ushuaia, Argentina that traversed the Drake Passage, at end of an Antarctic voyage that had begun on March 17. The Drake Passage defines a maritime, Atlantic-Pacific transition zone lying between South America's Cape Horn and Antarctica's South Shetland Islands, where the cool, subpolar conditions of the South American Tierra del Fuego archipelago meet the frigid, polar conditions of Antarctica; as a waterway it is 600 miles wide, and approaches 3 miles deep in places. Nathan Diller of USA Today, who reported having experienced waves of 13-feet during an earlier traverse, describes the Drake Passage as a "notoriously treacherous waterway between Antarctica and South America". News reports describe the ship as being "pummeled", and include video that suggested "walls of water... nearly all that is visible from the [ship's] windows", with the ship rocking enough that people were sliding across floors, a television was observed "slamming into a wall", etc. Passengers filming and being interviewed expressed confidence in their safety, and Quark Expeditions, noting its "30 years of experience navigating polar waters" and its "purpose-built, ice-class fleet and expert crew", communicated via email that safety, and "ensuring guests are well cared for in all conditions" remained its "top priority", stating that its "ship, crew, and passengers completed their... voyage safely and without incident".

== Polar expedition fleet ==
According to Lynn Elmhirst, Quark Expeditions "invented consumer polar expedition travel" with its 1991 expedition to the North Pole. As of this date, the company was reported to have the largest and most diverse fleet of passenger vessels in the Antarctic. Quark offers both cruises and land-based expeditions. Expeditions involve the following ships:

Fleet
Current Fleet					
Name	Year Completed	Shipyard	Passenger Capacity	Ice-class	Notes
Ultramarine	2021	Brodosplit shipyard, Croatia	199	1A+, PC6	First ship fully owned by Quark Expeditions.
Ocean Explorer	2021	Haimen shipyard, Jiangsu, China	138	1A, PC6	Chartered from Sunstone for the 2024-2025 Antarctic season, to replace Ocean Adventurer
World Voyager	2020	WestSEA Shipyard (Viana do Castelo, Portugal)	168	1B	Chartered from Atlas Ocean Voyages.
World Explorer	2019	WestSEA Shipyard, Viana do Castelo, Portugal	172	1B	Chartered from Mystic Cruises, will be renamed STAR EXPLORER and will be handed over to Windstar Cruises in December 2026.
Former Vessels					
50 Let Pobedy (50 Years of Victory)	1993	Baltic Shipyard	128	LL1	
Kapitan Khlebnikov	1981	Hietalahti Shipyard, Finland	108	LL3	
Ocean Adventurer	1975	Brodogradilište, Kraljevica, Yugoslavia SFR Yugoslavia (now Croatia)	128	1A	To be retired from Quark expedition service in October 2024

== Sustainability & charitable initiatives ==
Quark Expeditions describes itself as a long-time member of the Association of Arctic Expedition Cruise Operators (AAECO) and of the International Association of Antarctica Tour Operators (IAATO) and describes these as "organizations that share our dedication to promote and commit to environmentally responsible tourism... to help us to ensure the footprints polar tourists leave behind are minimal", and itself as "active participants in many sustainability initiatives". In 2019, it announced a "Polar Promise" sustainability strategy. In 2012, the company reported that Ocean Diamond made a carbon-neutral voyage to Antarctica.

== Awards and recognition ==
Quark Expeditions has received multiple industry awards for its expedition cruise operations and itineraries. The following honors have been reported in travel trade publications and award programs:

Year	Award Name	Publication
2025	Travelers' Choice Awards	Tripadvisor
2024	Best Expedition Cruise Line	Virtuoso
2024	Travel Vanguard	Afar Magazine
2024	Cruisers' Choice Best Expedition Cruise Line (#2)	Cruise Critic
2024	Best for Adventure: Expedition Category	Cruise Critic
2024	2024 Magellan Awards Gold Winner	Travel Weekly
2023	Best Expedition Cruise Line	Virtuoso
2023	2023 Magellan Awards Gold Winner	Travel Weekly
2023	Best Adventure Cruise Line (2023) (#7)	USA Today
2022	Best for Adventure	Cruise Critic
2022	World's Leading Specialist Cruise Line 2022	World Travel Awards
2022	World's Best Four-star Expedition Ship	Signature Luxury Travel & Style
2019	2019 Magellan Awards Gold Winner	Travel Weekly
2018	2018 Magellan Awards Gold Winner	Travel Weekly
