= Ice pier =

Man-made structure used to assist the unloading of ships in Antarctica

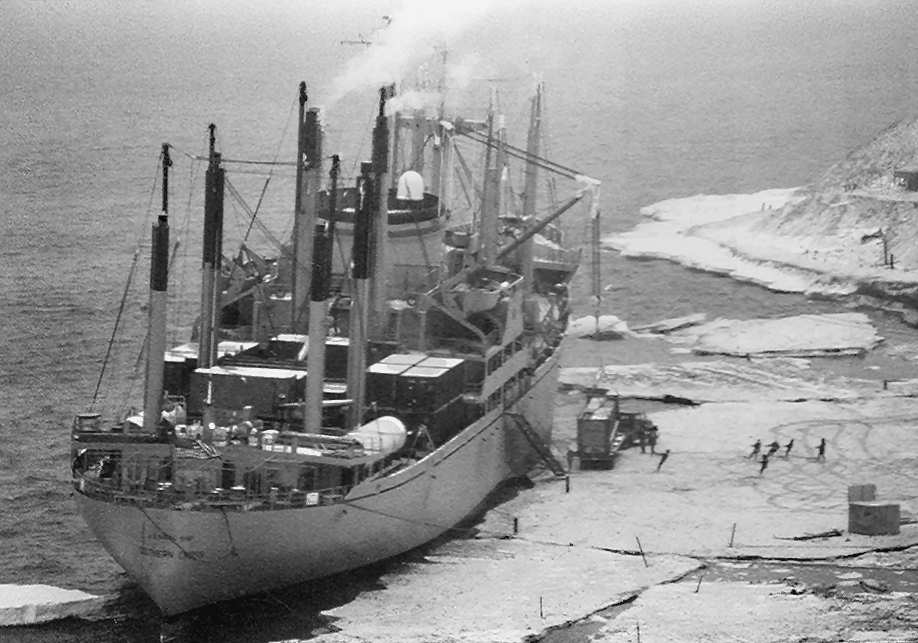
Severe cracks in an ice pier in use for four seasons at McMurdo Station slowed cargo operations in 1983 and proved to be a safety hazard.

An ice pier or ice wharf is a man-made structure used to assist the unloading of ships in Antarctica. It is constructed by pumping seawater into a contained area and allowing the water to freeze. By repeating this procedure several times, additional layers are built up. The final structure is many metres in thickness, and strong enough to support container trucks. Operation Deep Freeze personnel constructed the first floating ice pier at Antarctica’s southernmost sea port at McMurdo Station in 1973. Ice piers have been in use each summer season since, at McMurdo's natural harbor at Winter Quarters Bay located at 77°50′S 166°40′E. The harbor is positioned on the southern tip of Ross Island.

Historically, two supply ships, a freighter and a tanker, arrive at the ice pier each summer, after an icebreaker opens a ship channel through pack ice. The ice pier's key function is to provide a platform for freight trucks to come alongside a supply ship to receive or offload cargo. Steel cables attached to shoreline hold the dock in a fixed position.

Port officials distribute freight arriving at the dock to McMurdo Station, nearby Scott Base, and to field camps as far away as the South Pole. Imports include virtually any materials needed to support personnel living and working in Antarctica. Exports range from items such as scientific ice core samples and human waste collected from field camps to broken equipment and recyclables for return to the United States for processing.

Ice piers typically have a lifespan of three to five years. Once an ice pier is no longer usable, icebreakers tow the pier to sea to be cast adrift.

== Annual break-in opens ship channel ==
Ships docking at the McMurdo Station ice pier rely upon icebreakers opening a ship channel from Upper McMurdo Sound to Winter Quarters Bay. One or more icebreakers, depending upon seasonal conditions, will typically open a channel from 13 to 80 km (8 to 50 mi) long.

However, in 2005 icebreakers encountered more than 140 km (90 mi) of pack ice blocking entry to McMurdo Sound. The ice buildup occurred when a 160 km (100 mi) long iceberg (B15A) ran aground near Upper McMurdo Sound. Two icebreakers eventually broke a ship channel through to Winter Quarters Bay.

The ship channel provides a seaway for the few annual re-supply vessels and research ships which call upon the extraordinarily remote seaport at McMurdo Station. Preparation for the supply ships’ arrival includes icebreakers maintaining a uniform edge on the seaward side of the pier. The ship's skipper maneuvers the icebreaker to use its bow as a giant battering ram to scarf or shave jagged edges from the pier to facilitate ships tying up at the dock.

== Ice pier expedites shipping ==
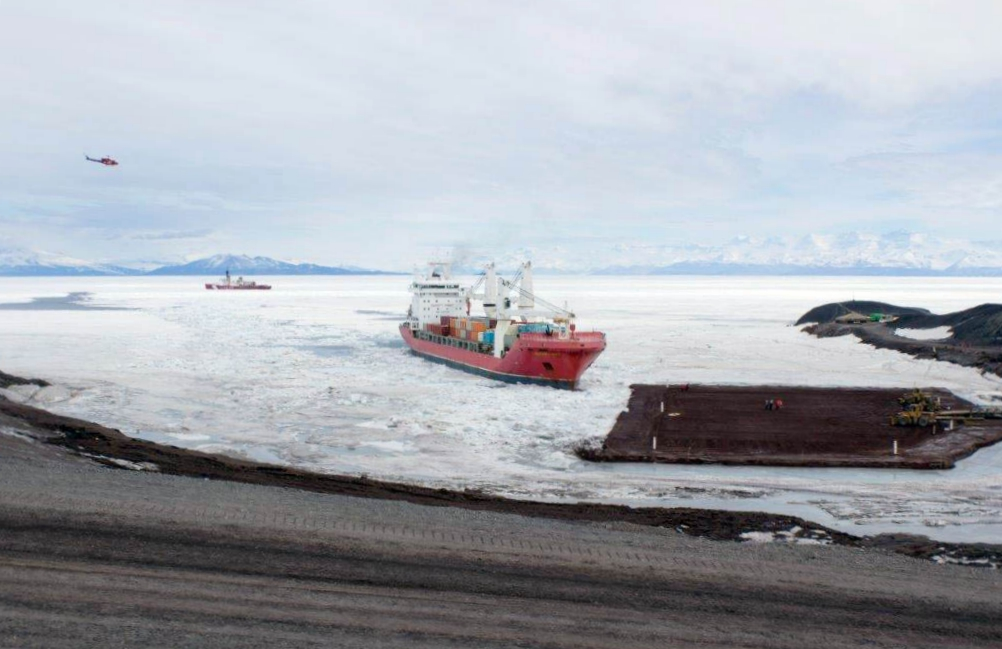
McMurdo Station's floating ice pier on the right, 2015

U.S. ships discharged cargo at temporary iceports in McMurdo Sound prior to the military's invention of the ice pier. Ships during that time moored alongside seasonal pack ice where military longshoremen offloaded cargo onto large snow sleds. Equipment operators then used snow cats and tractors to tow the freight over ice to McMurdo, a difficult and potentially dangerous operation. Tankers arriving with oil, diesel fuel, and gasoline were forced to dock as far away as 16 km (10 mi) from the harbour and pump their fuel ashore.

Beginning in 1964, icebreakers started opening a ship channel to Winter Quarters Bay where ships tied off to fast ice, a form of sea ice attached to the coast or ice wall such as Antarctica's Ross Ice Shelf. However, mooring to fast ice produced undesirable results. Warm water discharged from ships eroded ice at the rate of some three square kilometres every year.

Consequently, port authorities built a steel dock in 1972, which waves from a storm destroyed soon after. Builders came up with an alternative that same season. They constructed a block of ice, covered it with matting and straw and used it as a fender for a tanker that docked at the harbor in fall 1973. The ice fender became the forerunner to the contemporary ice pier.

McMurdo's dock is not without comparison. In 1987 workers constructed a similar pier in Mys Shmidta, a small seaport located in Chukotka, a far-eastern territory adjacent to Alaska on the Arctic Sea. And, like McMurdo, the Arctic ice pier facilitated getting ships to get closer to shore for loading cargo. The pier built in the former Soviet Union measured more than 700 metres (2,300 ft) long.

== Seawater construction ==
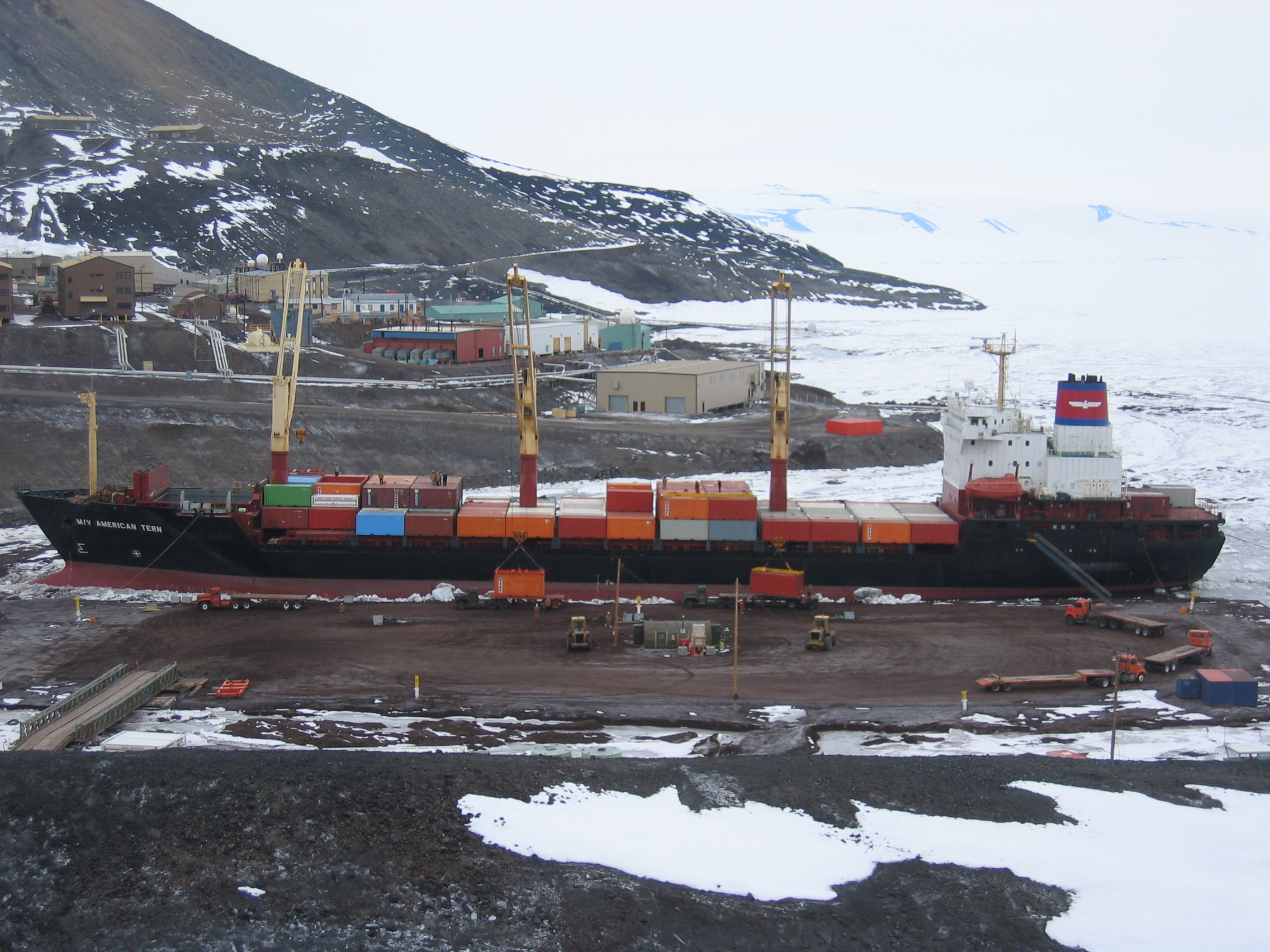
Ice piers at McMurdo Station have been used since 1973 to support cargo operations such as shown here in 2006 with the M/V American Tern. Note the Bailey bridge on left going from the short to the pier.

The ice piers deployed at McMurdo Station have grown in sophistication and size since the ice fender prototype. A contemporary pier is approximately 240 metres (800 ft) long by 90 metres (300 ft) wide and 7 metres (22 ft) thick. Fleet operations personnel make the floating pier during the winter. They build upon naturally occurring frozen seawater in McMurdo Sound after the pack ice reaches approximately 0.6 m (2.0 ft) in thickness.

Subsequently, workers construct a snow berm to a depth of several feet along the perimeter of the soon-to-be ice pier. High-volume pumps then flood the pack ice with seawater to a depth of about 10 cm (4 in). The seawater typically freezes solid within 24 hours. Personnel repeat the flooding until they achieve a thickness of 1.5 m (5 ft).

Next a reinforcement mat of approximately 2,100 m (6,900 ft) of 25 mm (1 in) steel cable is secured to 51 mm (2 in) steel pipe embedded in the ice pier. The pier overall requires approximately 6,300 m (20,700 ft) of steel cable for construction, according to National Science Foundation permit documentation.

Workers repeat the entire process three more times until the ice pier is approximately 6.7 m (22 ft) thick. Wooden utility poles drilled about four deep into the final ice pier support electrical and telephone service to the pier. Moreover, during the final construction phase, personnel mount shorter poles in the ice edge to serve as bollards to secure the pier to the shore at McMurdo. A 15–20 cm (6–8 in) layer of volcanic gravel tops off the pier to provide a non-slip surface and to insulate the ice from the summer sun.

Experience has shown that ice piers have a lifespan of three to five years. Factors such as stress cracking and erosion shorten the duration. In addition, storm surges, wave action, contact with vessels, and the warm water discharge from ships contribute to degradation of the pier's seaward edge.

== Ice pier limits discovered ==
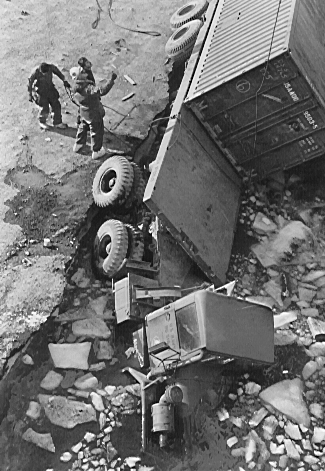
Cargo operations at McMurdo's ice pier in February 1983 involved a race against time before the breakup of the entire dock.

Ice pier operations at the world's most southern port have not been without mishap. The principal threat is onshore winds with accompanying high seas and ocean swells, which can severely damage the ice pier. For example, in 1993, high winds and heavy swells caused major cracks in the wharf. Rough seas produced movements of several feet between individual sections of the pier, according to a National Science Foundation (NSF) report. The resulting damage prevented vehicles from traveling onto the pier for repairs.

Conditions worsened the following week when additional storms pushed ice, slush, and sea water onto the pier, flooding about one-half of the dock. The inundation on the pier's seaward side reached 1 to 2 metres (3 to 6 ft) high and froze nearly immediately, according to the NSF report. The strategy to repair the storm damage included adding additional restraining cables followed by routine flooding to build up the ice thickness.

Notable incidents with damaged ice piers at McMurdo Station include an event 10 years earlier. The ice pier had been in use four seasons in 1983 when the freighter USNS Southern Cross docked at Winter Quarters Bay. Operation Deep Freeze officials pressed the pier into extended service in order for the freighter to make an unprecedented two supply runs in one season from Port Lyttelton, New Zealand, to McMurdo. However, efforts to extend the ice pier's lifespan resulted in a cargo truck breaking through the ice. The driver of the truck standing atop the container leapt to safety, receiving minor injuries.

The most recent incident in 2010 occurred when a 10-year storm blew in causing white cap waves to wash the pier out to sea. It was assumed to be lost with the Jamesway hut, telephone pole, bollards, and other equipment still on it. Found during the austral summer in 2011, the equipment was ferried by helicopter back to McMurdo. A tracking beacon was left on the Ice Pier as it drifted out to sea.

== Maintenance gives way to disposal ==
Maintenance on the ice pier begins at the end of the austral summer. Equipment operators remove the gravel and store it for the next season. Removing the gravel prevents the gravel's insulating qualities from inhibiting further thickening of the ice during winter. Winter operations include plowing insulating snow from the dock and flooding the pier with seawater to help sustain the ice strength.

However, when the pier is no longer usable, a permit from the Antarctic Conservation Act allows for an icebreaker to tow the ice pier out to McMurdo Sound and cast it adrift. Preparations for dumping include:

- Pumice surface is removed
- Wooden poles are cut off just above the surface of the ice
- All equipment, materials, and debris are removed

After release at sea, currents and southerly winds drive the ice pier north towards the Ross Sea and into the circumpolar currents of the Southern Ocean. A beacon mounted on the pier allows for tracking and serves as a warning to ships. The pier mixes with pack ice and eventually melts, a process that can take years, according to NSF estimates. Consequently, some 6,400 metres (21,000 ft) of 25 mm (1 in) steel cable and 200 metres (650 ft) of 51 mm (2 in) pipe used in its construction sink to the ocean floor

U.S. government reports vary regarding the fate of the untreated wooden bollards used in the ice pier. The wood in some instances is reported as weighted so as to sink. Yet a 1999 ocean dumping permit notes that: "the short lengths of wooden poles will float in the ocean for several months before becoming waterlogged and eventually sinking to the ocean floor."

== See also ==
- Icebreaker
- Iceport
- Ice road
- McMurdo Sound
- McMurdo Station
- Operation Deep Freeze
- Sea ice
- Scott Base
- Winter Quarters Bay
