= Utopia (cruise ship) =

Planned luxury residential ocean liner project

History
- Name: Utopia
- Owner: Utopia Residences
- Operator: Utopia Residences
- Port of registry: Bahamas
- Route: Circumnavigation of the world
- Ordered: November 20, 2009 (amended in 2012)
- Builder: Samsung Heavy Industries
- Cost: US$1.1 billion

General characteristics
- Type: Residential cruise ship
- Tonnage: 108,000 GT
- Length: 296 m (971 ft)
- Beam: 36 m (118 ft)
- Height: 50 m (160 ft)
- Draught: 8.3 m (27 ft)
- Decks: 16
- Installed power: 50,400KW 6 × Wärtsilä diesel engines
- Propulsion: 2 × 14 MW ABB Azipod, azimuthing; 3 × Bowthrusters total 9,000KW
- Speed: 22 KN
- Capacity: 199 luxury residences; 218-room hotel
- Crew: 600

Utopia is a planned luxury residential ocean liner project. A formal marketing launch of the ship, reportedly costing US$1.1 billion, was expected in 2021. The ship was originally planned to launch in 2017 but lack of funding got in the way and the binding letter of intent to build Utopia was amended in 2017. The ship was to be built by Samsung Heavy Industries, one of the largest shipbuilders in the world. The Finnish engineering company Elomatic Marine is credited for the design concept of the vessel, with architectural design by Tillberg Design U.S.

The original business plan called for residences with prices from US$3.9 million to US$30 million, but as of 2018 Utopia increased its prices to $36 million.

It is one of several residence cruise ships that are under construction or planned, including Njord, Dark Island and MV Narrative. MS The World and Villa Vie Odyssey are the only resident-owned cruise vessels currently in service as of 2024.

== Amenities ==
The 296 m (971 ft), 108,000 GT, ship will have 190 residences ranging in size from 130 to 613 m^{2} (1,400 to 6,600 sq ft). The ship will also have 175-room hotel, casino, 16,000 sq ft spa, night club, and many other amenities typical of large-scale commercial ocean-cruise liners. The company recently received regulatory approval for open floor plans and open-air kitchens (a first of its kind milestone for the passenger ship industry), which allows the kitchens to resemble the open-concept kitchens in modern North American land-based homes.

== Financing ==
The ship will be largely financed by the Frontier Group, a private equity firm with offices in Los Angeles and Washington, D.C. Frontier will put up most of the funds to cover the US$1.1 billion in construction costs. In 2018, Frontier reported that the financing contingencies have been removed, clearing the path for the project to continue forward. In 2014, Utopia Residences shipbuilding contract was suspended due to insufficient funding. In 2017, a letter of intent was amended with Samsung Heavy Industries reflecting the vessel has been ordered with planned delivery and launch in 2022.
