= Crown Cruise Line =

Former cruise line

- Industry: Cruise ships
- Founded: 1984
- Defunct: 2001
- Headquarters: 1984–1992: Boca Raton, Florida, United States and 1992–2001: Hollywood, FL, United States
- Parent: Grundstad Maritime Overseas Inc. Effjohn International; Commodore Holdings LTD
- Website: crowncruiseline.com (Archive)

Crown Cruise Line was a small, upper-class cruise operator, which was founded by Oddmund Grundstad and Grundstad Maritime Overseas Inc. based in Boca Raton, Florida. The operation was eventually overseen by Effjohn International's Commodore Cruise Line and all ships were leased or sold to other cruise operators.

== History ==
The cruise line began in 1984 with the Viking Princess, which initially operated out of San Diego, California on short cruises to Ensenada, Baja California and Santa Catalina Island, California. After finally reaching an agreement with the Port of Palm Beach Commission, the Viking Princess was transferred to Palm Beach for daily sailings to Freeport, Bahamas and coastal cruises to nowhere.

With the success of the first ship and opportunities in the growing cruise line industry, the line invested in a second ship which had been built in 1967 as the ferry Las Palmas de Gran Canaria for the Spanish state-owned shipping company Trasmediterranea. In 1986 the ship returned to the yard where she was built, Unión Naval de Levante in Valencia, for a massive refit and conversion to a cruise ship. In 1988 she emerged as the Crown del Mar and was chartered to Crown Cruise Line operating from Palm Beach on two-night Bahamas and five-night Western Caribbean itineraries.

At the same time, Crown ordered a brand-new ship from Union Naval de Levante. The Crown Monarch, delivered in 1990, sailed on seven-day cruises from Palm Beach to Key West, Grand Cayman, Ocho Rios in Jamaica and Labadee Shores, Crown's private beach in Haiti. Except September and October, when the ship departs for three seven-day Canada cruises and one two-week cruise from New York to the Caribbean. The ship was designed to have a yacht-like ambiance by GMO Design Inc. of Boca Raton and had 265 staterooms and suites, including 400-square-foot staterooms with whirlpool tubs, a 288-seat dining room, tiered showroom, a disco and a jazz lounge. With the delivery of the $95 million Crown Monarch, Crown terminated the Crown del Mar lease in 1991, stating that the former ferry "did not fit with the fresh image".

A new 45,000 square foot cruise terminal was constructed for use by Crown Cruise Line at the Port of Palm Beach and opened in 1990. The facility includes areas for baggage and the U.S. Customs and Border Protection Agency (CBP) on the ground floor, and passenger check-in areas on the second floor. A radial-telescoping, enclosed, adjustable-height passenger bridge is provided from the second floor to the north side of Slip 1.

The Gulf war and recession in 1991 affected tourism spending, and the cruise company scaled back their operation. Crown's parent company, Grundstad Maritime, split the company in two. The day cruises aboard the Viking Princess moved under the name Palm Beach Cruises. The Crown Cruise Line name, marketing, and 50% ownership of the Crown Monarch were turned over to Commodore Cruise Line and parent company Effjohn International, a Scandinavian shipping firm. Grundstad Maritime continued to provide crew and sail the Crown Monarch.

Two additional new sister ships, the Crown Jewel and the Crown Dynasty, had been ordered from Union Naval de Levante for delivery in 1992 and 1993. The Cunard Line took over marketing, sales and reservations for Crown in 1993 and the three ships were placed in the new Cunard Crown division. Each had the prefix Cunard added to her name, and the three were transferred from the Port of Palm Beach to Port Everglades in Broward County.

== Former ships ==
Ship	Year built	Gross tonnage	Length	Port of registry	Also sailed as:	Image
Viking Princess	1964	6,659 GT	128 m (419 ft 11 in)	Panama	1964–1984: Ilmatar; 1984–1991: Viking Princess (Crown Cruise Line); 1991–1995: Viking Princess (Palm Beach Cruise Line); 1997–2010: Palm Beach Princess (Palm Beach Casino Line)	
Crown Del Mar	1967	9.725 GT	130.6 m (428 ft 6 in)	Panama	1967–1987: Las Palmas de Gran Canarias (CompaÒia Trasmediterrànea); 1988–1990: Crown del Mar (Crown Cruise Line); 1994–2000: Don Juan (Royal Hispania); 2000–2004: Riviera I (Interamericana de Comercio y Gestión); 2004–2005: Royal Pacific (King Crown International)	
Crown Monarch	1990	15,271 GT	152.5 m (500 ft 4 in)	Panama	1990–1992: Crown Monarch (Crown/Commodore Cruise Line); 1993–1994: Cunard Crown Monarch (Cunard); 1994–1996: Nautican (Crown Cruise Line); 1996–1997: Walrus (Ki Development Corp.); 1997: Havens Star (Ki Development Corp. - Casino ship in Hong Kong); 1997–2004: Neptune (Ki Development Corp. - Casino ship in Hong Kong); 2004–2007: Rembrandt II (Ki Development Corp. & Champ Elysees, MV Ltd); 2007–2008: Jules Verne (Vision Cruises); 2008–2012: Alexander von Humboldt II (Phoenix Seereisen & Bamtur); 2012–2017: Voyager (Voyages of Discovery) 2018 - present Vidanta Elegant ( Grupo Vidanta). Currently the ship is out of service.	
Crown Jewel	1992	19,089 GT	163.68 m (537 ft 0 in)	Panama	1992–1993: Crown Jewel (Crown Cruise Line); 1993–1995: Cunard Crown Jewel (Cunard); 1995–2009: Superstar Gemini (Star Cruises); 2009–2009: Vision Star (Star Cruises); 2009–2016: Gemini (Quail Travel Group) 2016 - 2017: Celestyal Nefeli (Celestyal Cruises) 2019 - Present: Gemini (Miray Cruises)	
Crown Dynasty	1993	19,089 GT	163.68 m (537 ft 0 in)	Panama	1993–1993: Crown Dynasty (Crown Cruise Line); 1993–1997: Cunard Crown Dynasty (Cunard); 1997–1997: Crown Majesty (Majesty Cruise Line); 1997–1999: Norwegian Dynasty (NCL); 1999–2001: Crown Dynasty (Commodore Cruise Line); 2001 - 2023: Braemar (Fred Olsen Cruises) 2024 - Present: Odyssey (Villa Vie Residences)	
