= MS The World =

Residential cruise ship

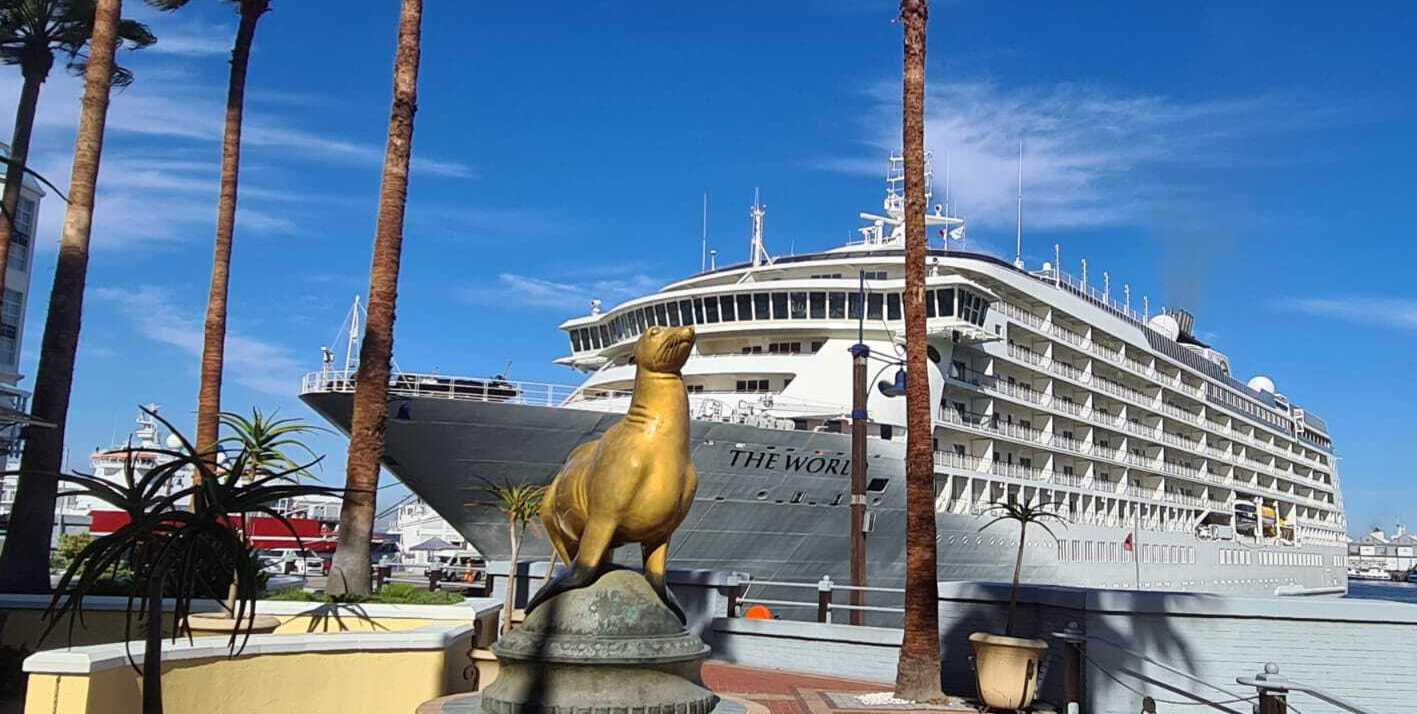
- The World in Cape Town, South Africa, in 2024

History
- Name: The World
- Operator: ROW Management, Ltd. Fort Lauderdale, Florida, United States
- Port of registry: Nassau, Bahamas
- Ordered: 2000
- Builder: Fosen Mek. Verksteder A/S in Rissa Municipality, Norway
- Yard number: N.71
- Laid down: 2001
- Launched: 28 February 2001
- Completed: 20 February 2002
- Identification: IMO number: 9219331; MMSI number: 311213000; Callsign: C6RW4
- Status: Currently in service (privately owned)

General characteristics
- Type: Residential cruise ship
- Tonnage: 43,188 GT
- Length: 196.35 m (644 ft 2 in)
- Beam: 29.8 m (97 ft 9 in)
- Draft: 6.7 m (22 ft 0 in)
- Decks: 12
- Installed power: Marine diesel
- Speed: 18.5 knots (34.3 km/h; 21.3 mph)
- Capacity: 150-200 passengers average
- Crew: 280

MS The World is a private residential cruise ship operated like a condominium complex, with large apartments that can be purchased. The residents, from many countries, can live on board as it travels. Some choose to live onboard full-time while others visit periodically. It is operated by ROW Management, Ltd., headquartered in Fort Lauderdale, Florida, United States.

It has 165 residences (106 apartments, 19 studio apartments, and 40 studios), all owned by residents. Average occupancy is 150–200 residents and guests.

The World is registered in The Bahamas and has a gross tonnage of 43,188. It is 196.35 metres (644 ft 2 in) long, 29.8 metres (98 ft) wide, and has a 6.7-metre (22 ft) draft, 12 decks, and a maximum speed of 18.5 knots (34.3 km/h; 21.3 mph). The crew numbers approximately 280.

On 28 January 2017, The World broke the then world record for being the southernmost ship, which was later surpassed by the icebreaker ship Laura Bassi in February 2023. The voyage was achieved by its captain, Dag H. Sævik, and the 63 residents on board at the time as well as crew-members. It reached 78°43′58.82″S 163°41′25.26″W at the Bay of Whales in the Ross Sea in Antarctica.

In March 2020 it was emptied of passengers and non-essential crew because of concerns about the COVID-19 pandemic. The World returned to service in July 2021.

Several other residence cruise ships are under construction or planned, including Utopia, Njord, Dark Island, MV Narrative. and Ulyssia. At least one, Villa Vie Odyssey, was functioning as a residential cruise ship until October 2026, when shortage of fuel led to passengers being disembarked.

== Original concept and construction ==
It was the idea of Knut Kloster, whose family had a long history in the marine industry. Its originally announced name was The World of ResidenSea, which was later shortened to The World. The hull was built in Landskrona, Sweden, by Öresundsvarvet, and it was then towed to Fosen Mekaniske Verksteder in Rissa, Norway, for completion. It was launched in March 2002 and purchased by its residents in October 2003.

The management company is responsible for operations and administration of it, including hiring employees. The residents, through their elected board of directors and a network of committees, provide guidance to the management about its itinerary, finances and lifestyle.

== Facilities ==
It has a large lobby, deli and grocery store, a boutique, fitness center, billiard room, golf simulator and putting greens, tennis court, jogging track, spa, swimming pool, and cocktail lounges.

There are six restaurants for dining that supplement the kitchens or kitchenettes in most of the residences. For on-board entertainment there are a movie theater, library and music performances. In addition to shore excursions, various classes have been offered on board. The World provides internet access in each residence.

== Northwest Passage transits ==
Setting sail from Nome, Alaska, U.S. on 18 August 2012 and reaching Nuuk, Greenland on 12 September 2012 via the waterways through Canada's Arctic Archipelago, The World became the largest passenger vessel at the time to transit the Northwest Passage. Carrying 481 passengers and crew, for 26 days and 4,800 nautical miles (8,900 km) at sea, it followed in the path of Captain Roald Amundsen, the first sailor to complete the journey in 1906. In 2019 it traversed the Passage from east to west, becoming the 300th vessel to make the voyage, and the largest to do so in both directions.

== COVID-19 ==
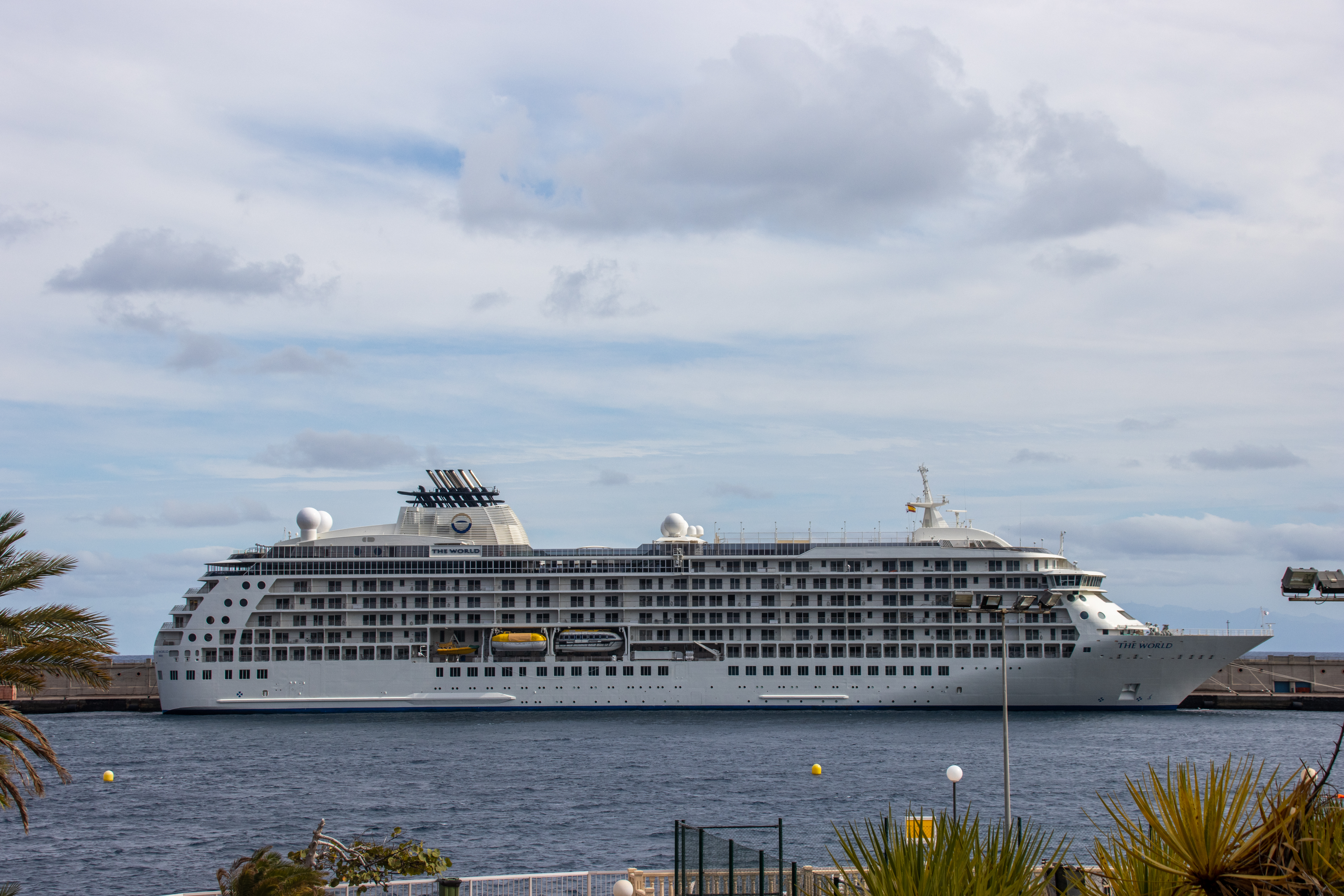
The ship in Santa Cruz de Tenerife in October 2020

In March 2020 it unloaded all passengers and non-essential crew because of concern about COVID-19 infection.

In April 2020 it was asked to leave the port of Fremantle, Australia. The government of New Zealand received a request to let it shelter in a local port. This was denied, as New Zealand had banned cruise ships and non-New Zealand residents from entering the country. In 2020 it was in lay-berth in Falmouth, Cornwall, and Santa Cruz de Tenerife, Spain, before returning to service in July 2021.

== See also ==
- Seasteading – Concept of creating permanent dwellings at sea
