= Ulyssia =

Residential gigayacht under development

History
- Name: Ulyssia
- Owner: Ulyssia Residences AG
- Route: Global residential cruising
- Ordered: 2024
- Builder: China Merchants Cruise Shipbuilding
- Completed: Expected 2031
- Status: Under development
- Notes: Privately owned residences at sea

General characteristics
- Class & type: Residential gigayacht
- Length: 324 m (1,063 ft 0 in)
- Capacity: 133 residences, 22 guest suites
- Notes: Designed by Espen Øino (exterior), Francesca Muzio (interior)

Ulyssia is a residential gigayacht currently under development, with an expected length of 324 metres (1,063 ft 0 in). The project is being led by Ulyssia Residences AG, a company established by Swiss national Frank Binder. The vessel is designed to operate as a mobile residential community and is planned to offer long-term leases for onboard living units.

== Overview ==
The contract for construction was signed with China Merchants Cruise Shipbuilding (CMCS), with completion projected for 2031. The vessel's exterior design is by Norwegian naval architect Espen Øino, and the interior design is being led by Francesca Muzio of FM Architettura. Upon completion, the vessel is expected to include 133 privately owned residences and 22 guest suites. Residence pricing reportedly ranges from US$10 million to 90 million, depending on unit size and layout.

== Design and residences ==
The vessel's exterior is planned to include large glass surfaces and a streamlined profile. Interior layouts are reported to include residential units ranging from 110 square metres (1,200 sq ft) to over 930 square metres (10,000 sq ft), with configurations offering multiple bedrooms, kitchens, and private terraces. Residence holders will also acquire a proportional share in the operational management entity.

== Development team ==
The project is headed by Frank Binder, who has a background in architecture and is a descendant of the Merck family. Key roles within the development include Alain Gruber as chief executive officer and Renato W. Chizzola as chief operating officer. The project team comprises individuals with experience in maritime engineering, hospitality operations, and large-scale ship management. The Board of Directors of Ulyssia Residences AG consists of Frank Binder, Andrew Lampert, and Oliver Wolfensberger.

== Links ==
- Official site

== See also ==
- MS The World
- Luxury yacht
