= Villa Vie Odyssey =

Cruise ship

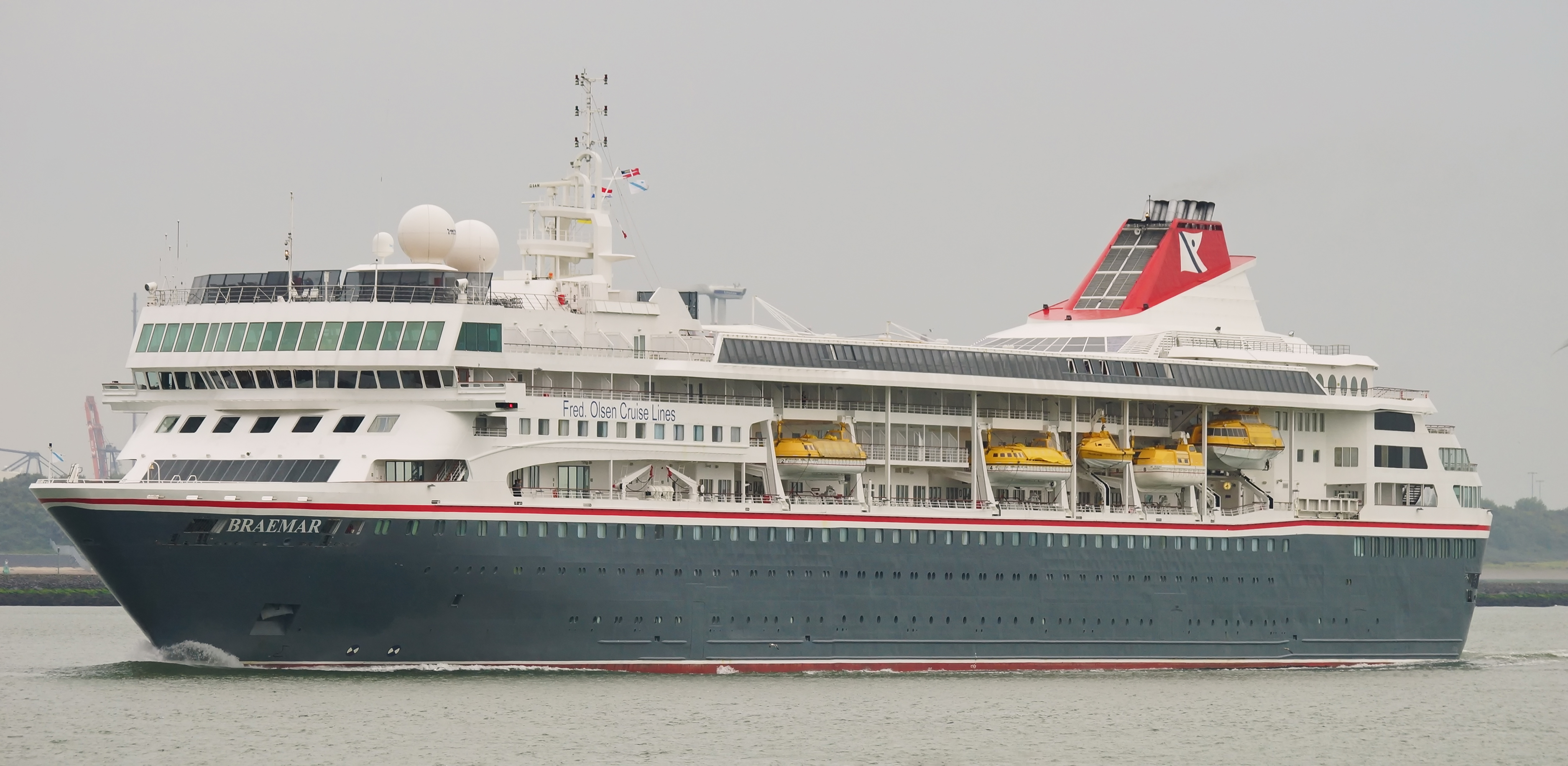
- Braemar in Nieuwe Waterweg

History
- Name: 1993: Crown Dynasty; 1993–1997: Cunard Crown Dynasty; 1997–1997: Crown Majesty; 1997–1999: Norwegian Dynasty; 1999–2001: Crown Dynasty; 2001–2024: Braemar; 2024–present: Villa Vie Odyssey
- Operator: 1993–1993: Crown Cruise Line; 1993–1997: Cunard Line; 1997–1997: Majesty Cruise Line; 1997–1999: Norwegian Cruise Line; 1999–2001: Commodore Cruise Line; 2001–2022: Fred Olsen Cruises; 2024–present: Villa Vie Residences
- Port of registry: 1993–: Panama City, 2003–present: Nassau, (The Bahamas)
- Builder: Unión Naval de Levante, Valencia
- Yard number: 198
- Laid down: 21 March 1991
- Launched: 31 January 1992
- Completed: 21 June 1993
- Identification: Call sign: C6SY7; IMO number: 9000699; MMSI number: 311541000
- Status: Arrested in Singapore

General characteristics
- Type: Cruise ship
- Tonnage: 24,344 GT
- Length: 195.82 m (642 ft 5 in)
- Beam: 22.52 m (73 ft 11 in)
- Draught: 5.41 m (17 ft 9 in)
- Installed power: 4 x Wärtsilä 8R32 diesel engines
- Propulsion: 2 × Controllable pitch propellers; 2 × bow thrusters
- Speed: 17 knots (31 km/h; 20 mph)
- Capacity: 929 passengers
- Crew: 371

Villa Vie Odyssey is a cruise ship operated by Villa Vie Residences for its 3 1/2-year, residence-style cruise concept. Since her construction in 1993, the ship has been variously known as Braemar, Crown Dynasty, Cunard Crown Dynasty, Crown Majesty, and Norwegian Dynasty.

== History ==
=== Cunard / Majesty / Norwegian ===
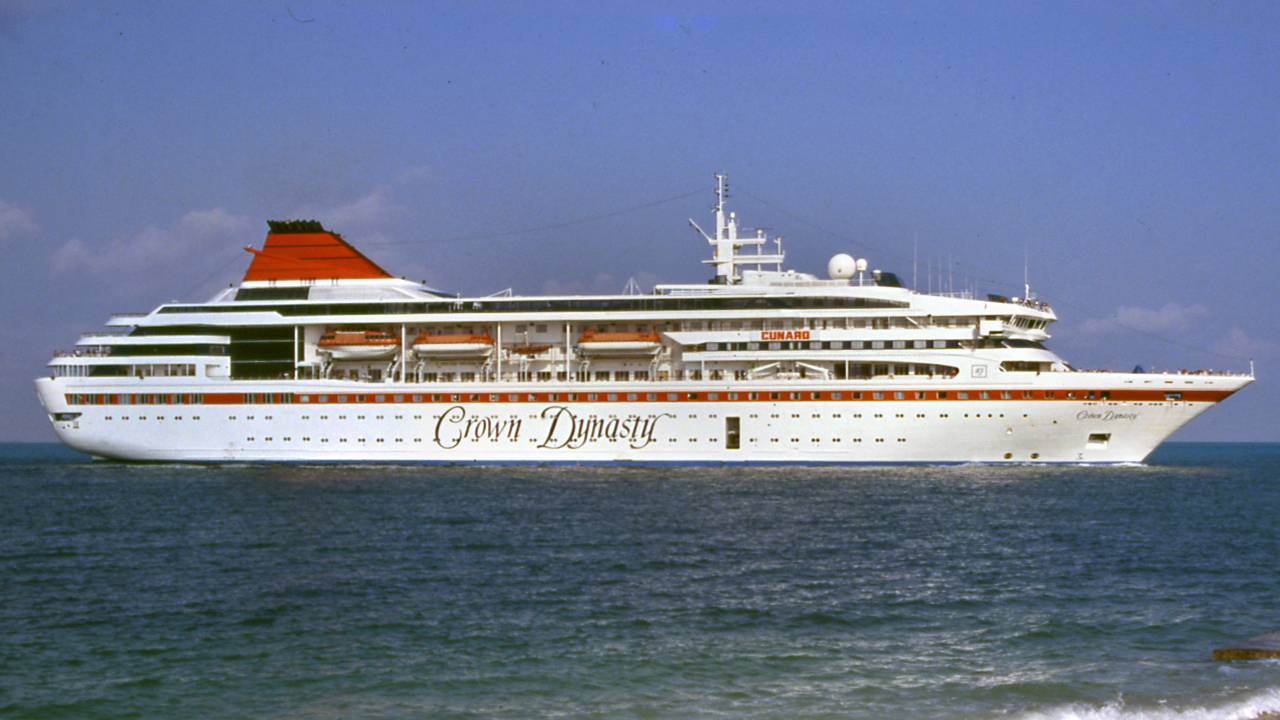
Crown Dynasty in Cunard livery, 1995

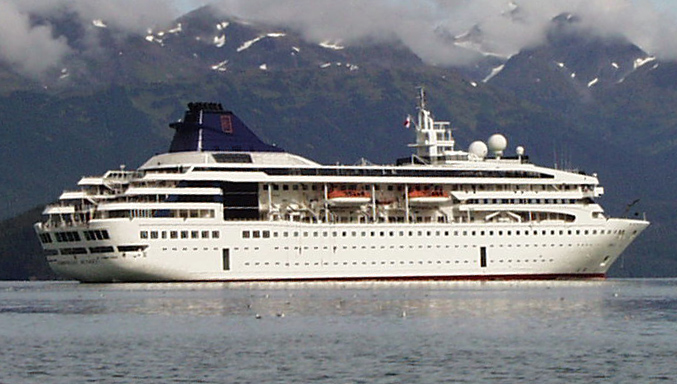
Norwegian Dynasty in 1998

Odyssey was initially constructed in 1993 for Crown Cruise Line as Crown Dynasty, but she was marketed as the "Cunard Crown Dynasty" when Cunard Line signed an agreement to manage marketing, sales, and reservations for Crown Cruise Line. The vessel sailed under this name until 1997, when she was transferred to Majesty Cruise Line, which renamed her Crown Majesty. This lasted until the end of 1997, when the vessel was transferred again, this time to Norwegian Cruise Line, which renamed her Norwegian Dynasty. The vessel returned to her original fleet and name in 1999.

=== Fred Olsen ===
The vessel was sold to Fred. Olsen Cruise Lines in 2001, where the vessel operated under the name Braemar until 2020.

In 2008, the vessel underwent a refit and was stretched, receiving a new 31-metre (102 ft) hull section that increased its tonnage to the current 25,000 GT. The ship's passenger capacity was also increased to 977.

On 9 October 2019, while carrying her full capacity of 929 passengers, she became the longest ship ever to cruise through the Corinth Canal.

On 8 March 2020, government officials in Cartagena, Colombia, announced that a recently disembarked passenger had tested positive for COVID-19, and was accepted by a private local clinic for care. On 9 March 2020, government officials in Alberta, Canada, announced that a recently disembarked passenger had tested positive for COVID-2019. A day later, Alberta officials confirmed a second infection of a passenger returning from Braemar. On 13 March, the ship was denied entry to the Bahamas as a result of five passengers testing positive for the virus. Sint Maarten also denied a request from the cruise ship to allow passengers to fly out. The infected passenger disembarked off the cruise in Kingston, Jamaica, but it was unknown where they contracted the disease. On 16 March, it was announced that Cuba would accept the ship and evacuate all travelers to the United Kingdom.

In November 2022, the ship still had not returned to service; Fred Olsen cruises put the ship up for sale.

=== Villa Vie ===
In 2023, Villa Vie Residences bought the ship, renaming her Villa Vie Odyssey, for their 3 1/2-year residential style cruise. The vessel was handed over to Villa Vie Residences in February 2024 with more than 70% of cabins sold (340/485 approximately). She left the dockyard where she was laid up and arrived at Harland & Wolff shipyard in Belfast for refitting on 28 April 2024. While in drydock, the ship's itinerary suffered several delays, as rudder, gearbox and other issues were discovered. Future residents waiting for a revised sailing date either remained in Belfast or toured Europe on trips subsidized by the company. Villa Vie Odyssey was floated out of the dock on 24 July and moved to the ship repair quay on 2 August. She sailed out on the evening of 30 September. However, due to a failure to complete what was described as "some final pieces of paperwork", she anchored just outside Belfast that night. She left the Belfast anchorage at approximately 16:30 BST on 3 October on her way to Brest, France.

As of February 2025, the ship had visited western Europe, northwest Africa, then transited the Atlantic Ocean, and the Panama Canal before moving south to the Strait of Magellan.

On 27 October 2026, Villa Vie chief executive Kathy Villalba announced that the company was suspending operations due to an increase in fuel costs, and residents were ordered to disembark in Sihanoukville, Cambodia until a further decision can be made on whether to resume operations. Fuel costs reportedly rose as much as 344% in parts of Asia where the cruise was operating at the time. In a statement, the company said that the fuel prices had risen to US$6,000-8,000 per cabin, up from around US$1,800. While they said they were working with residents to "identify temporary living arrangements," some passengers claimed that they had received no support to find or pay for hotels. The company's CEO later said it planned to file for Chapter 11 bankruptcy after running out of money while trying to find a financial partner.

According to the head of the Sihanoukville tourism authority, the ship departed on November 4, 2026, with about 50 crew members on board. He stated that approximately 100 passengers remained in Cambodia, while most of the others flew to other destinations in the region. The ship was placed under arrest when it arrived in Singapore on 8 November 2026.

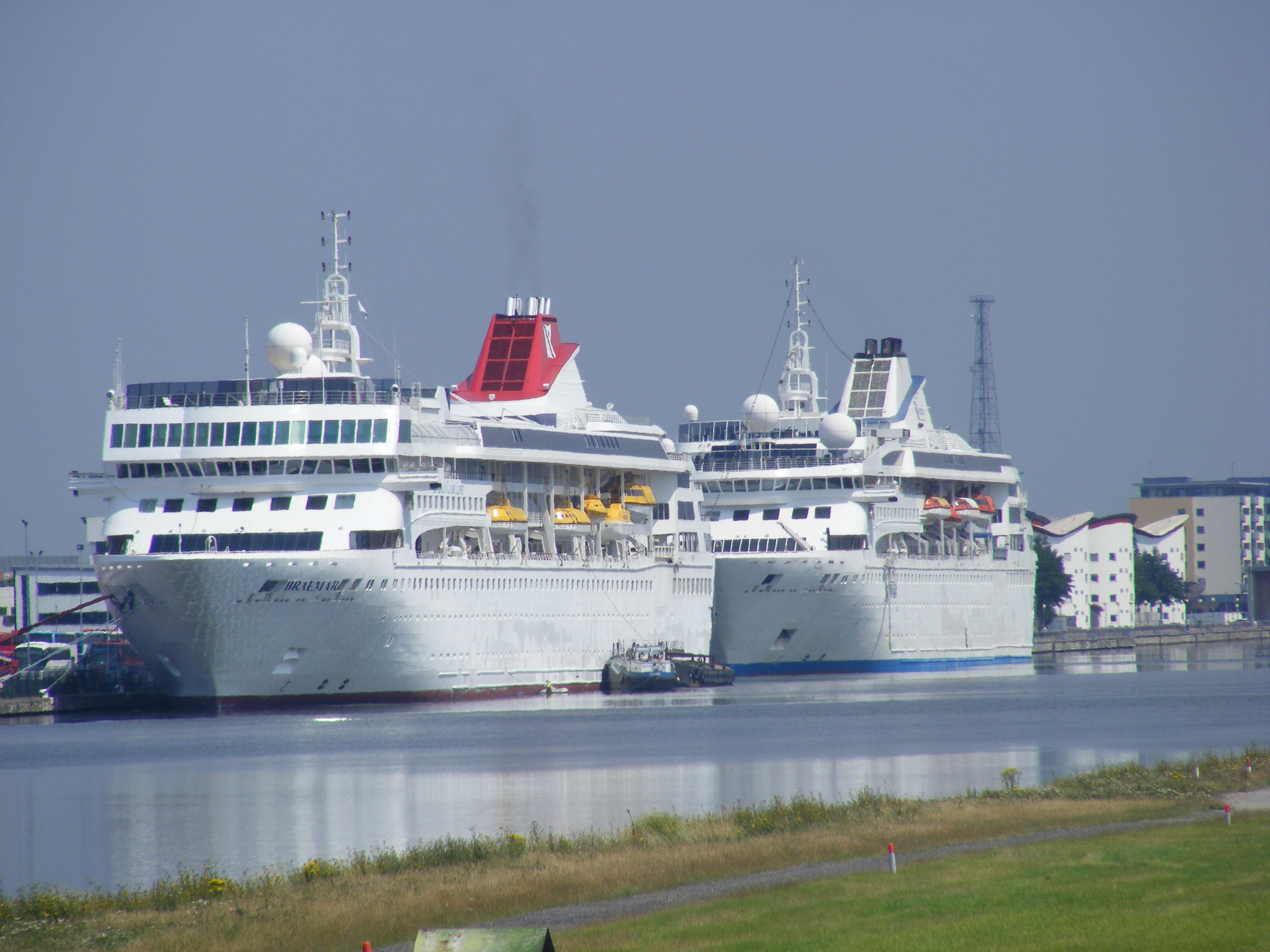
Braemar with former sister ship Gemini in London, 2012

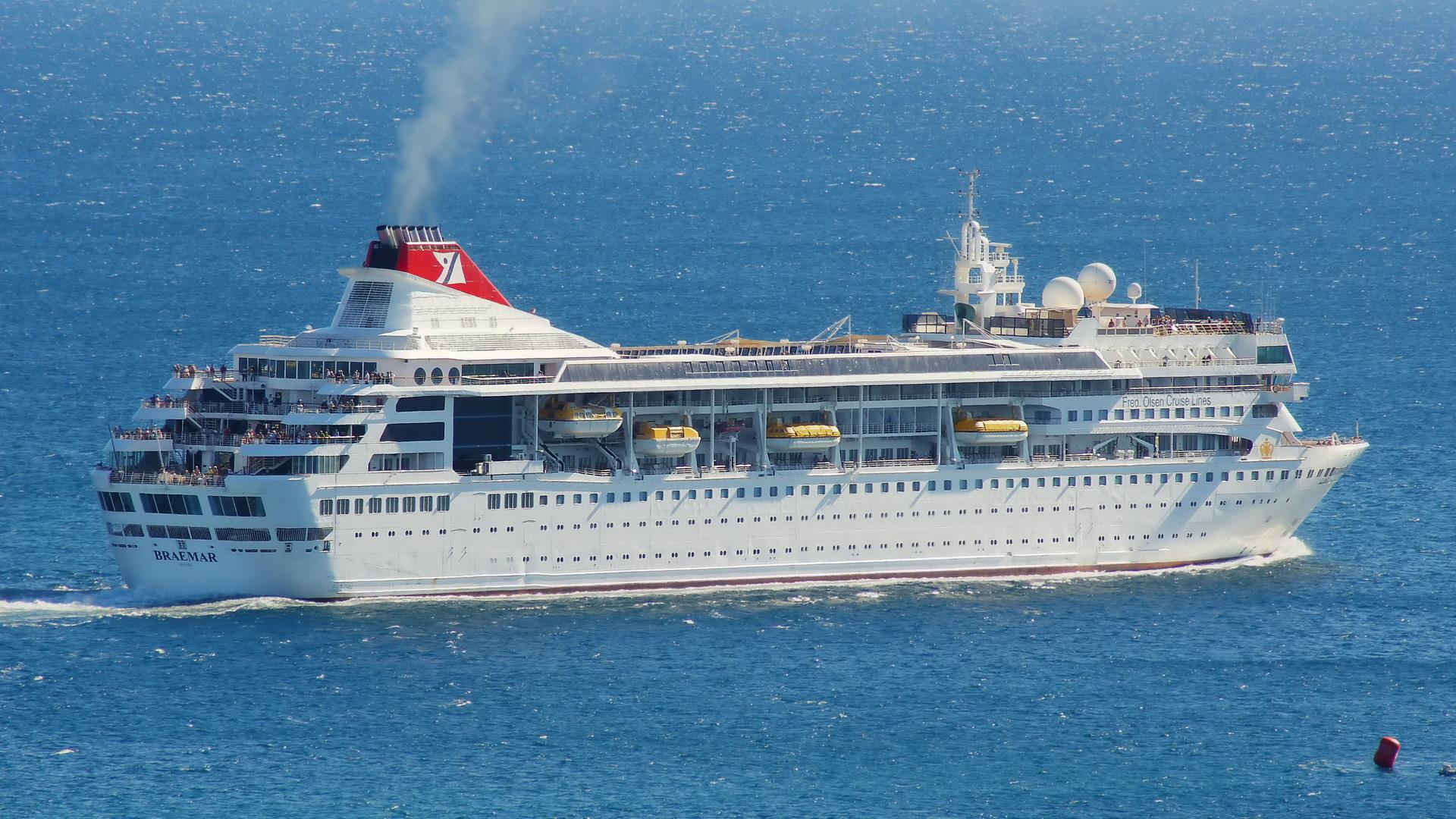
Braemar in 2014; ship received an extensive renovation on behalf of Fred. Olsen Cruise Line

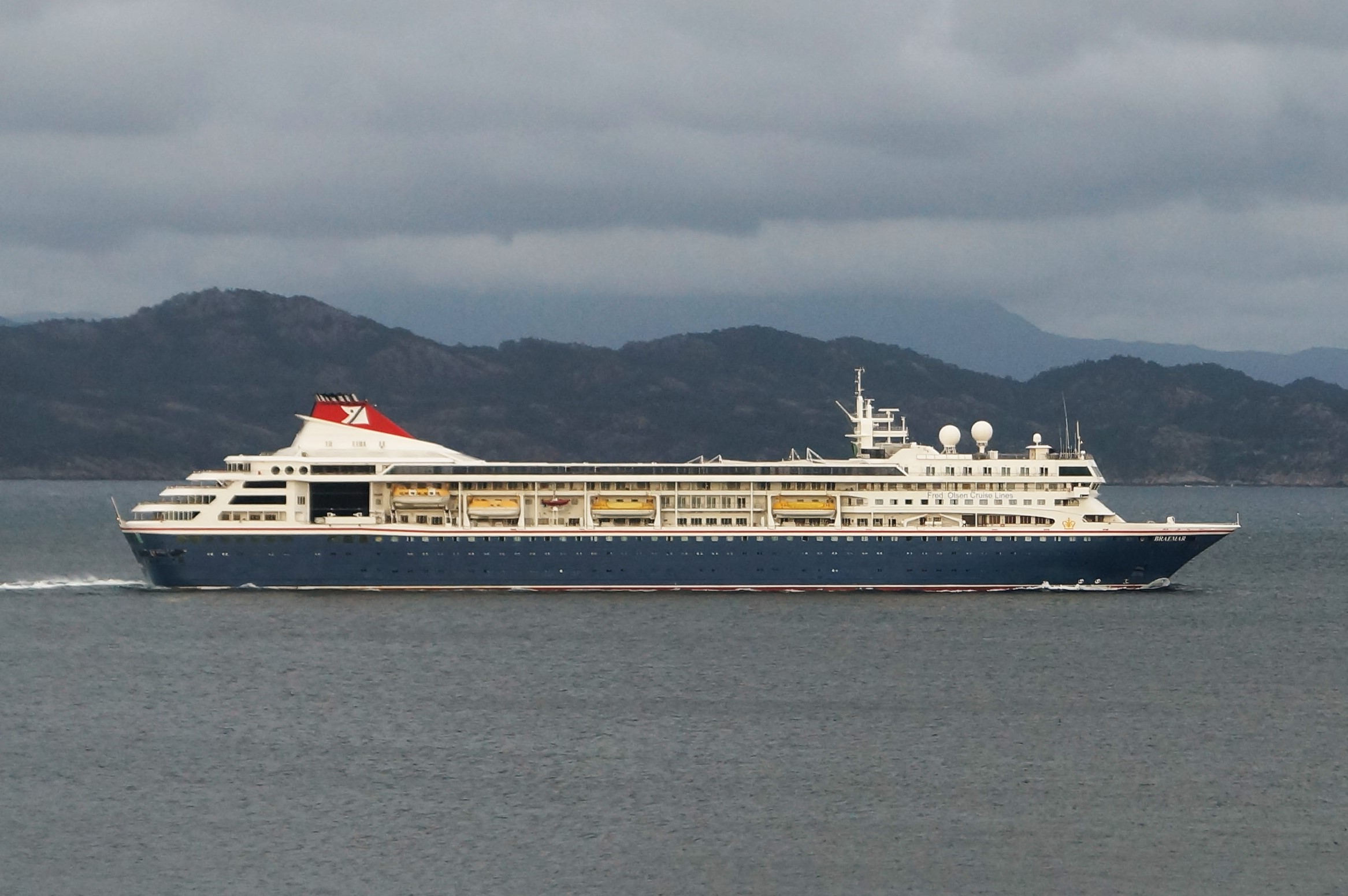
Braemar in 2019 with the new livery of Fred. Olsen Cruise Line, the penultimate livery for the ship before becoming Villa Vie Odyssey

== See also ==
- MS The World – Residential cruise ship
