= Celestyal Discovery =

Cruise ship built in 2003

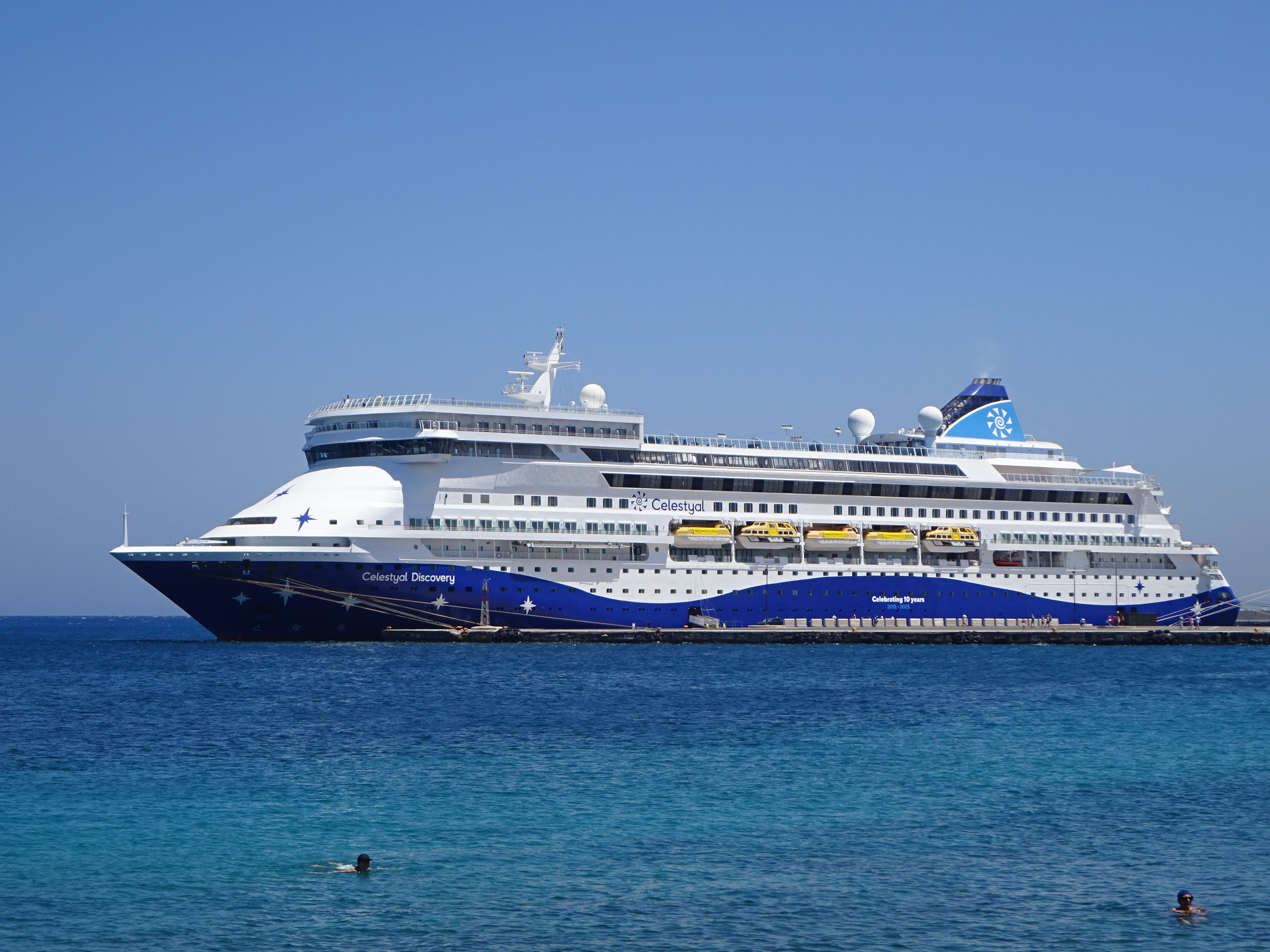
- Celestyal Discovery at Quay in Port of Rhodes (August 2025)

History
- Name: 2003-2023: AIDAaura; 2023: Lara (cancelled); 2023-present Celestyal Discovery
- Owner: 2003–2023: Carnival Corporation & plc; 2023: Miray Cruises (cancelled, never registrered to Miray Cruises due to lack of funding); 2023-present Celestyal Cruises
- Operator: 2003-2023: AIDA Cruises; 2023: Life At Sea Cruises (cancelled); 2023-present Celestyal Cruises
- Port of registry: 2003–2004: London United Kingdom; 2004–2023: Genoa Italy; 2023 onwards: Valletta Malta
- Builder: Aker MTW (Germany)
- Cost: $350 million
- Yard number: 004
- Laid down: 11 January 2002
- Launched: 7 September 2002
- Christened: 12 April 2003
- Completed: 3 April 2003
- Maiden voyage: April 2003
- In service: 2003–present
- Identification: Call sign: 9HA5930; IMO number: 9221566; MMSI number: 256667000; DNV ID: G94691
- Status: In service

General characteristics
- Type: Cruise ship
- Tonnage: 42,289 GT; 4,157 DWT
- Length: 202.85 m (665 ft 6 in) oa; 179.74 m (589 ft 8 in) pp
- Beam: 28.1 m (92 ft 2 in)
- Draft: 8.75 m (28 ft 8 in)
- Installed power: 27,150 kW (36,410 hp)
- Propulsion: Diesel-electric; 2 screws
- Speed: 19.5 knots (36.1 km/h; 22.4 mph)
- Capacity: 1,266 passengers
- Crew: 389

Celestyal Discovery is a cruise ship, built in 2003 by the German shipyard Aker MTW in Wismar, and was operated by AIDA Cruises for twenty years as AidaAura, as was her sister ship AIDAvita. In November 2023 the ship was sold to the Greek cruise line Celestyal Cruises and entered service in March 2024.

== Description ==
Celestyal Discovery is considered a mid-sized cruise ship measuring 202.85 m (665 ft 6 in) long overall and 179.74 m (589 ft 8 in) between perpendiculars with a beam of 28.1 m (92 ft 2 in) and a draft of 8.75 m (28 ft 8 in). The cruise ship has a 42,289 gross tonnage (GT) and measures 4,157 tons deadweight (DWT). The vessel is powered by a diesel-electric system turning two screws rated at 27,150 kilowatts (36,410 hp). The ship has a maximum speed of 19.5 knots (36.1 km/h; 22.4 mph).

The cruise ship has capacity for 1,266 passengers. Celestyal Discovery has 633 cabins, ranging from 13.5–32.0 square meters (145–344 sq ft) in size of which 60 are equipped with a balcony. The vessel is equipped with several amenities for the passengers including bars, lounges, a library and a two-storey theater. Celestyal Discovery has a crew of 389. The vessel has a swept-back funnel and a wedge-shaped stern.

== Construction and career ==
The cruise ship was laid down on 11 January 2002 at the Aker MTW shipyard in Wismar, Germany with the yard number 004. The vessel was launched on 14 September 2002 and completed on 3 April 2003. The vessel cost $350 million. The vessel was christened AIDAaura by International model Heidi Klum on 12 April 2003 at Warnemünde. The vessel made its maiden voyage in April 2003. In 2003, the vessel was built for P&O Cruises, a subsidiary of Carnival Corporation & plc, which took over ownership of the vessel and registered the cruise ship in London, United Kingdom. In 2004, AIDAaura was acquired by Costa Crociere and the registry moved to Genoa, Italy and the operator changed to AIDA Cruises, a subsidiary of the Carnival Corporation.

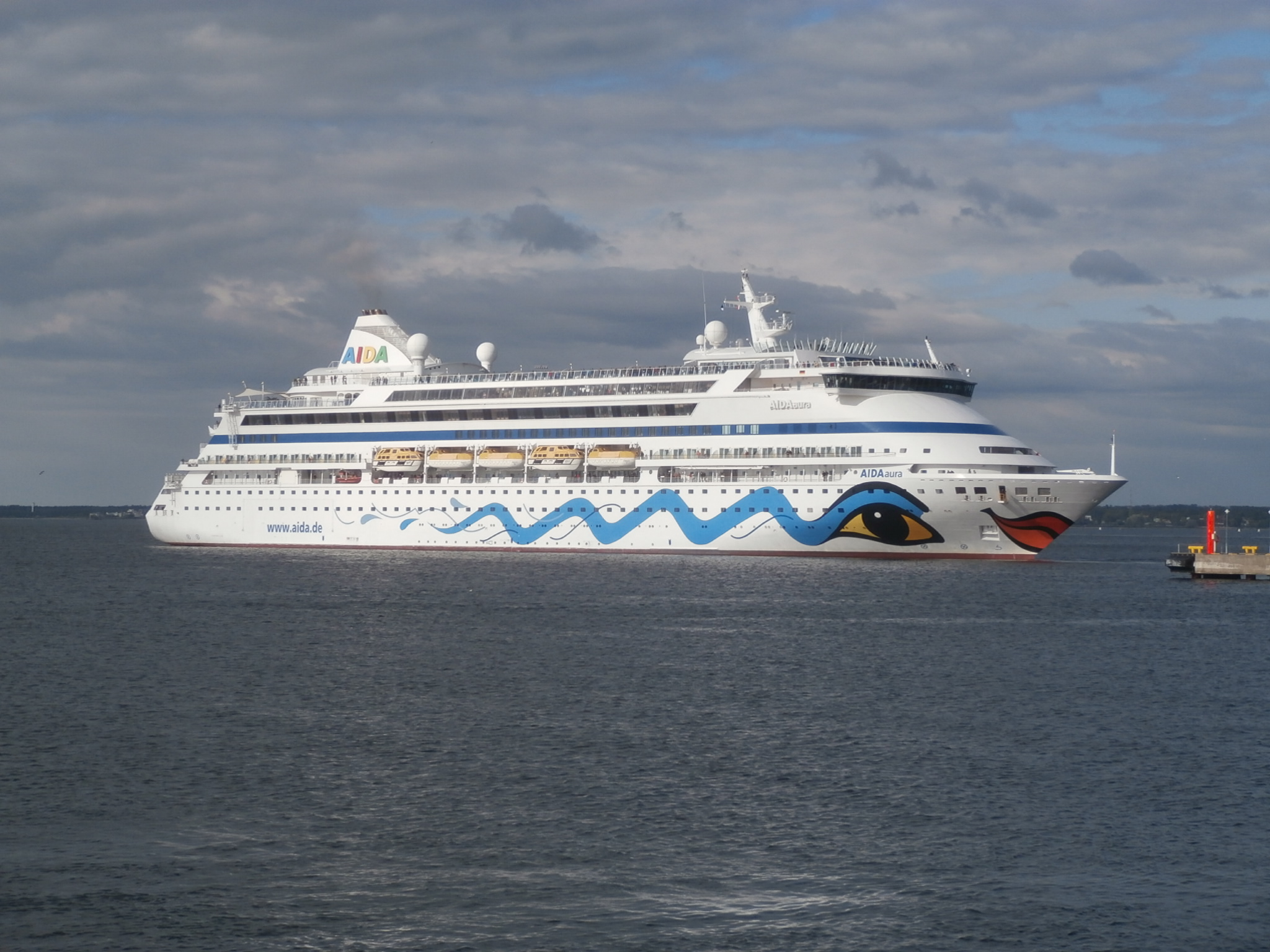
MV AIDAaura departing Tallinn 17 May 2016

On 8 October 2018, AIDAaura departed from Hamburg on a 117-day round-the-world cruise. The ship visited 41 ports in 20 countries on four continents. AIDAaura, with about 1,200 people on board, was held on 3 March 2020 in the harbor of Haugesund, Norway, while two asymptomatic German passengers were tested who had been in contact with a person who subsequently developed COVID-19; their test results were negative.

In January 2023 AIDA Cruises said that the ship would be decommissioned in autumn 2023. Istanbul-based Miray Cruises announced in June that they had acquired a ship, for delivery in September, reported to be AIDAaura, for their Life at Sea Cruises intended 3-year world voyage, beginning in November 2023. Replacing the intended Gemini, the ship would be renamed Lara and undergo renovations in Istanbul. The last voyage of the AIDAaura ended in Bremerhaven, Germany on 21 September 2023. In November it was reported that Miray were no longer the buyer, with speculation that it would now be Celestyal Cruises.

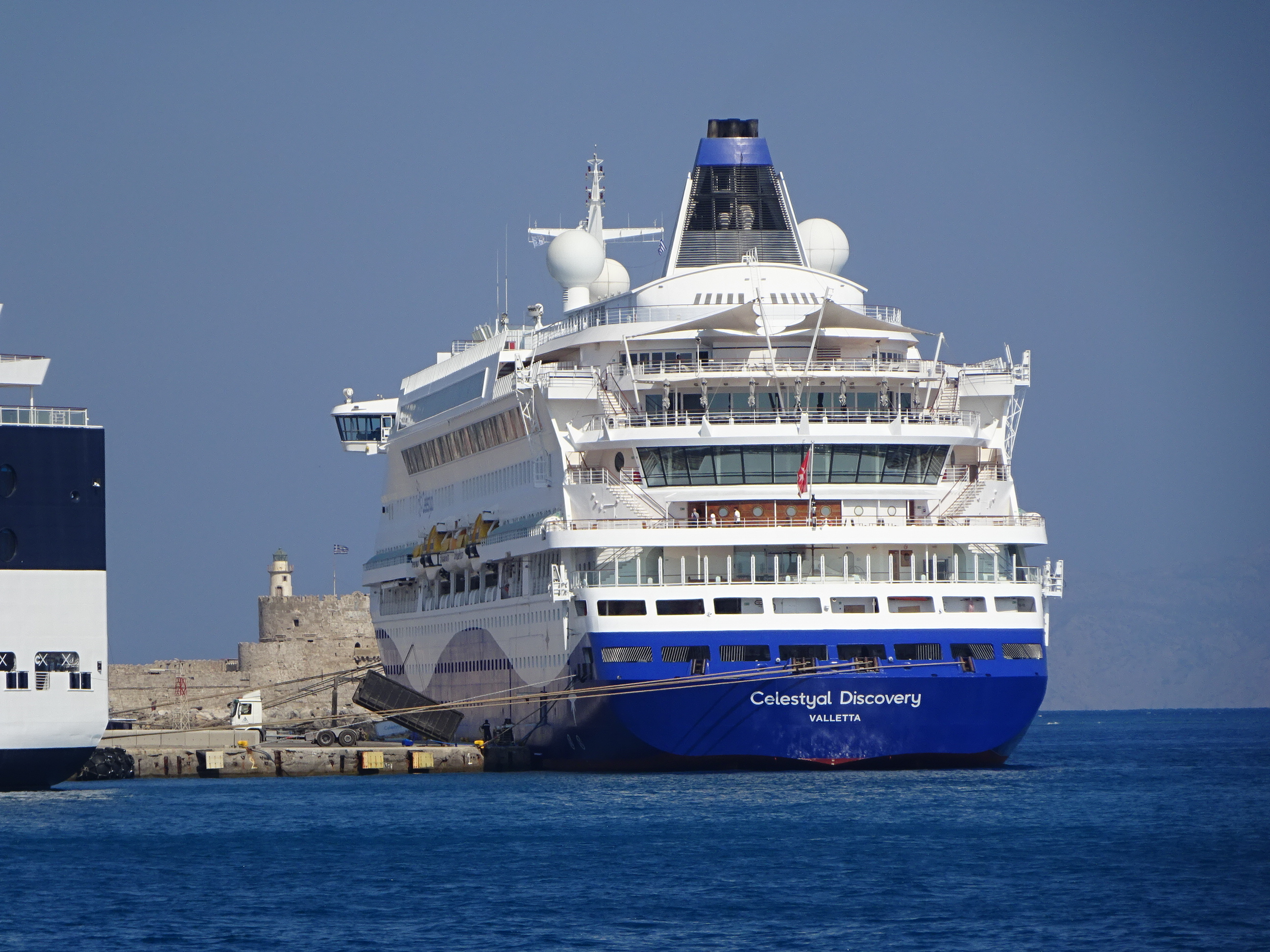
Celestyal Discovery in Quay in Port of Rhodes, August 2024

On 16 November 2023, Celestyal Cruises confirmed their purchase of AIDAaura and stated that she would enter service in March 2024 as Celestyal Discovery after a winter refit, replacing Celestyal Olympia. The ship entered service on 22 March 2024. Celestyal plans to add 47 cabins.

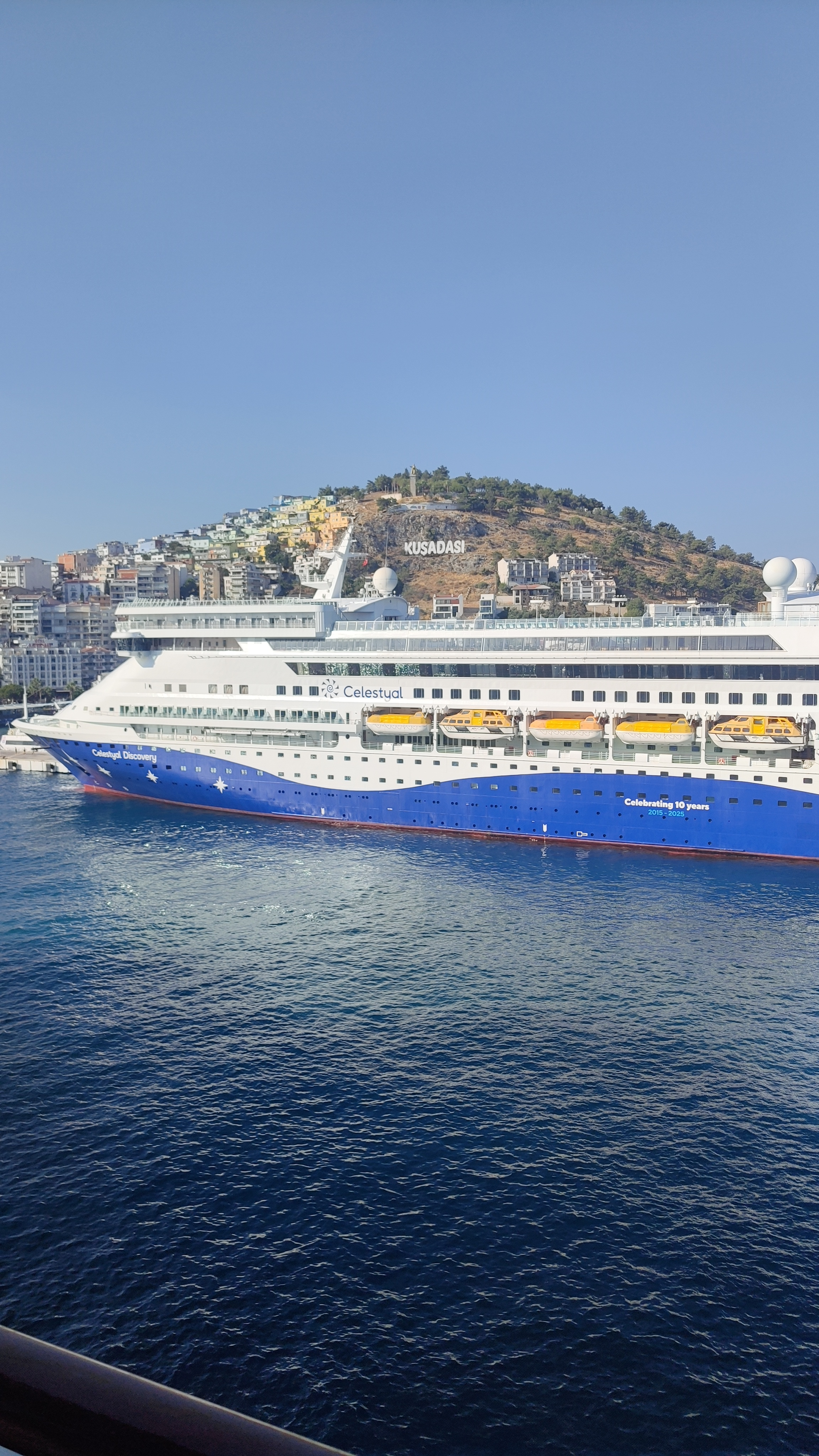
Celestyal Discovery already with its expansion to new 47 cabins

=== 2026 Iran war ===
Celestyal Discovery along with its sister ship Celestyal Journey were among the many cruise ships that canceled trips in the Middle East following the joint American—Israeli attack on Iran on 28 February 2026. Celestyal Discovery was docked in Dubai, United Arab Emirates, when hostilities broke out and trips that were scheduled in March were canceled thereby prematurely ending the ship's Arabian winter cruise season. The ship was able to leave the Persian Gulf via the newly reopened Strait of Hormuz on 17 April 2026.

== Sources ==
- "Aidaaura (G94691)". Vessel Register for DNV. DNV.
- "AIDAaura (9221566)". Equasis. Ministry of Ecology, Sustainable Development and Energy.
- "Aidaaura (9221566)". Miramar Ship Index.
- Ward, Douglas (2005). Berlitz Complete Guide to Cruising & Cruise Ships 2006 (21st ed.). Singapore: Berlitz. ISBN 978-9812-4673-9-3.
- Ward, Douglas (2019). Berlitz Complete Guide to Cruising & Cruise Ships 2020 (28th ed.). Singapore: Berlitz. ISBN 978-1-78573-250-8.
