= MS Ilmatar =

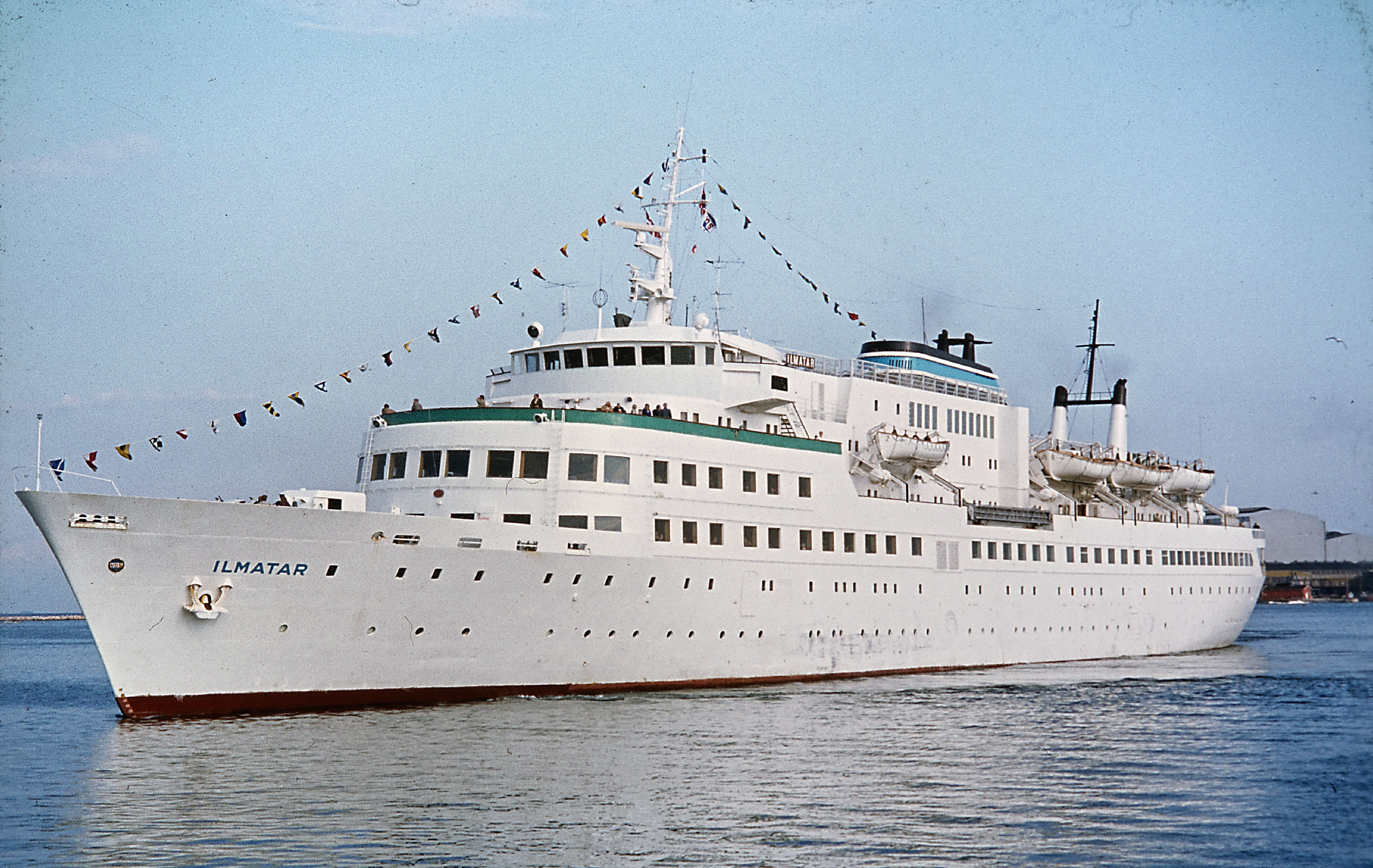
- Ilmaltar in Copenhagen on 19 June 1981

History
- Name: 1964–1984: Ilmatar; 1984–1997: Viking Princess; 1997–2015: Palm Beach Princess
- Namesake: Ilmatar (original name)
- Owner: 1964–1980: Finland Steamship Company; 1980–1984: Vesteraalens Dampskibsselskab; 1984–1997: Grundstad Maritime Overseas; 1997–1999: Deerbrooke Invest; 1999–2006: MJQ Corporation; 2006–2008: Cruise Holdings; 2008-2011: Mauro Sebben / Platinum Real Estates LLC; 2011: Imperial Ships LLC
- Operator: 1964–1970: Finland Steamship Company; 1970–1974: Finland Steamship Company (Silja Line traffic); 1974–1975: laid up; 1975: Finland Steamship Company; 1975–1976: Finnlines; 1976–1978: Finland Steamship Company; 1978–1980: Effoa (Silja Line traffic); 1980–1982: Vesteraalens Dampskibsselskab; 1982–1984: laid up; 1984–1995: Crown Cruise Line; 1995–1997: laid up; 1997–2010: Palm Beach Casino Line
- Port of registry: 1964–1980: Helsinki, Finland; 1980–1984: Norway; 1984–2011: Panama; 2011: Bolivia
- Ordered: 14 July 1962
- Builder: Wärtsilä Hietalahti shipyard, Helsinki, Finland
- Yard number: 375
- Launched: 29 October 1963
- Christened: 29 October 1963 by Sylvi Kekkonen
- Completed: 1964
- Acquired: 15 June 1964
- Maiden voyage: 1964
- In service: 15 June 1964
- Out of service: 2010
- Identification: IMO number: 6402937
- Fate: Scrapped in 2015.

General characteristics (as built)
- Type: Ferry
- Tonnage: 5,101 GRT; 680 DWT
- Length: 108.27 m (355 ft 3 in)
- Beam: 16.40 m (53 ft 10 in)
- Draught: 4.50 m (14 ft 9 in)
- Decks: 6 (passenger accessible)
- Installed power: Wärtsilä-Sulzer 12MD51 (3,300 kW)
- Propulsion: One propeller
- Speed: 16.50 knots (30.56 km/h; 18.99 mph)
- Capacity: 1,000 passengers; 332 passenger berths; 50 cars
- Crew: 93

General characteristics (after 1973 refit)
- Type: Ferry
- Tonnage: 7,155 GRT; 830 DWT
- Length: 128.31 m (421 ft 0 in)
- Installed power: 1 × Wärtsilä-Sulzer 12MD51 (3,300 kW); 2 × NOHAB SF116VSF (2 × 2,118 kW)
- Propulsion: Three propellers
- Speed: 19 knots (35 km/h; 22 mph)
- Capacity: 1,210 passengers; 470 passenger berths; 75 cars
- Crew: 113

General characteristics (after 1979 refit)
- Type: Cruise ship
- Tonnage: 6,659 GT
- Decks: 6 (passenger accessible)
- Capacity: 470 passengers
- Notes: Otherwise same as built

The MS Ilmatar was originally a ferry built in 1964 by Wärtsilä Hietalahti shipyard, Helsinki, Finland for Finland Steamship Company. From 1970 until 1974 and again from 1978 to 1980 she was marketed as a part of the Silja Line fleet. In 1973 she was lengthened at HDW Hamburg, Germany by 20.04 m (65 ft 9 in). Between 1975 and 1976 she was chartered to Finnlines. In 1979 she was converted to a cruise ship.

In 1980 the Ilmatar was sold to Vesteraalens Dampskibsselskab, without a change of name. In 1984 she was sold to Grundstad Maritime Overseas and renamed Viking Princess for cruising with Crown Cruise Line. From 1997 she was operated by Palm Beach Cruises and received the name Palm Beach Princess for casino cruises out of the Port of Palm Beach in Riviera Beach, Florida. After several further changes of ownership, the ship was sold for scrap in 2011.

On 28 November 1968 the Ilmatar collided with the Siljavarustamo ferry Botnia in the Åland archipelago, resulting in the death of six people on board the Botnia.

== Concept and construction ==
In the early 1960s the Finland Steamship Company decided to construct a 5,171 gross register ton ship for the Finland—Sweden service the company operated in collaboration with Steamship Company Bore, Rederi AB Svea, and Siljavarustamo, a joint subsidiary of the three companies. For the first time in Finland SS Co's history, the new ship was fitted with diesel engines and included side-loadable car deck for 50 cars. Her service speed was planned at 16.50 kn (30.56 km/h), and she was to carry 1000 passengers, 332 of them in two classes with berths and the rest as classless deck passengers.

The construction of the new vessel was awarded to Wärtsilä Hietalahti shipyard, and she was the largest ship built by the shipyard at the time. On 29 October 1963 the ship was launched and christened Ilmatar (spiritess of the air, a character from the Finnish national epic Kalevala) by Sylvi Kekkonen, the wife of Urho Kekkonen who was the President of Finland at the time. The Ilmatar was delivered on 15 June 1964.

The Ilmatar was found to be too small from the start, and in 1973 she was docked at HDW Hamburg, Germany, where she was lengthened by 20.04 m (65 ft 9 in), increasing her passenger capacity to 1210, passenger berths to 450 and car capacity to 75. Additional engines and two additional propellers increased her speed to 20 kn (37 km/h). Due to the increased passenger capacity the number of crew carried was also increased from 93 to 113. In 1978–1979 she was rebuilt for cruise service at the shipyard that had built her, with cabins rebuilt and a casino, swimming pool, gym, cinema and lounge featuring live entertainment were added.

== Service history ==
=== 1964–1980 ===
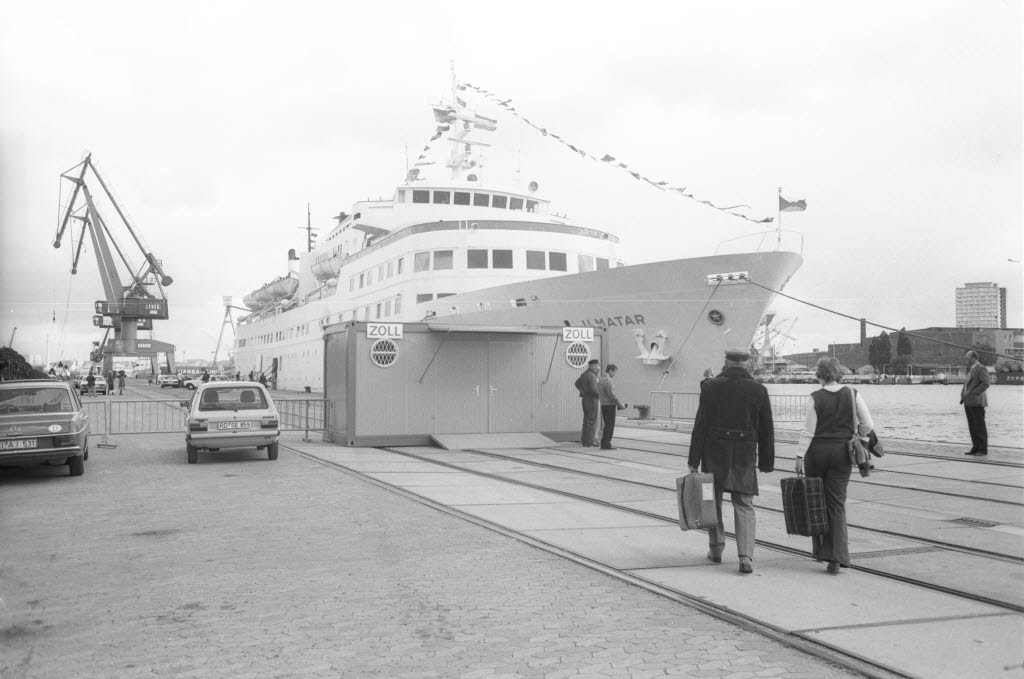
Ilmatar at Kiel.

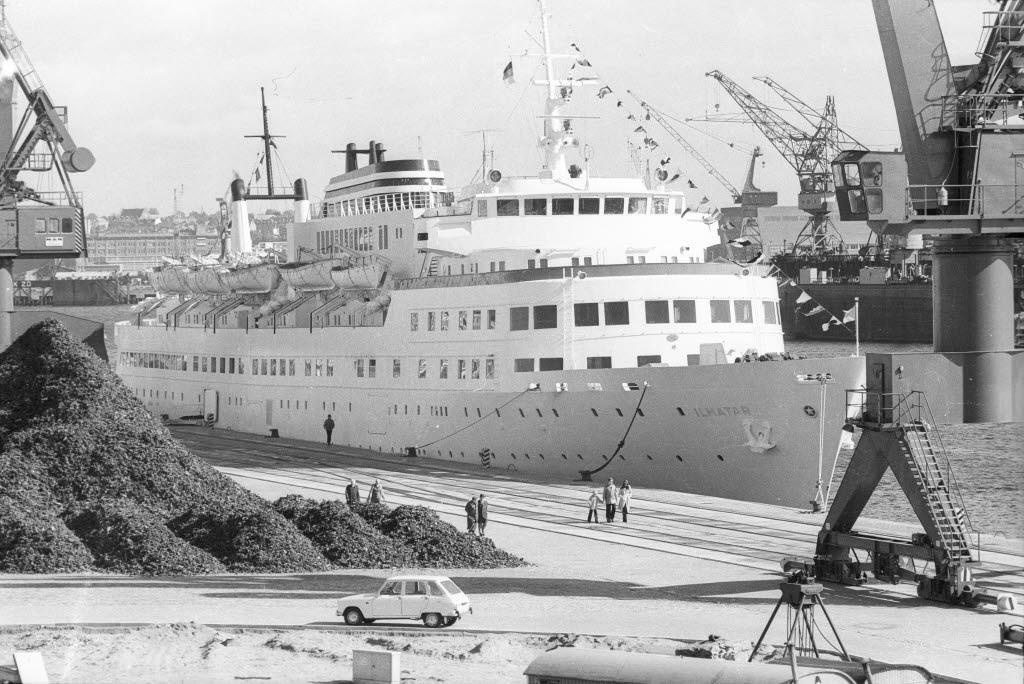
Ilmatar at Kiel.

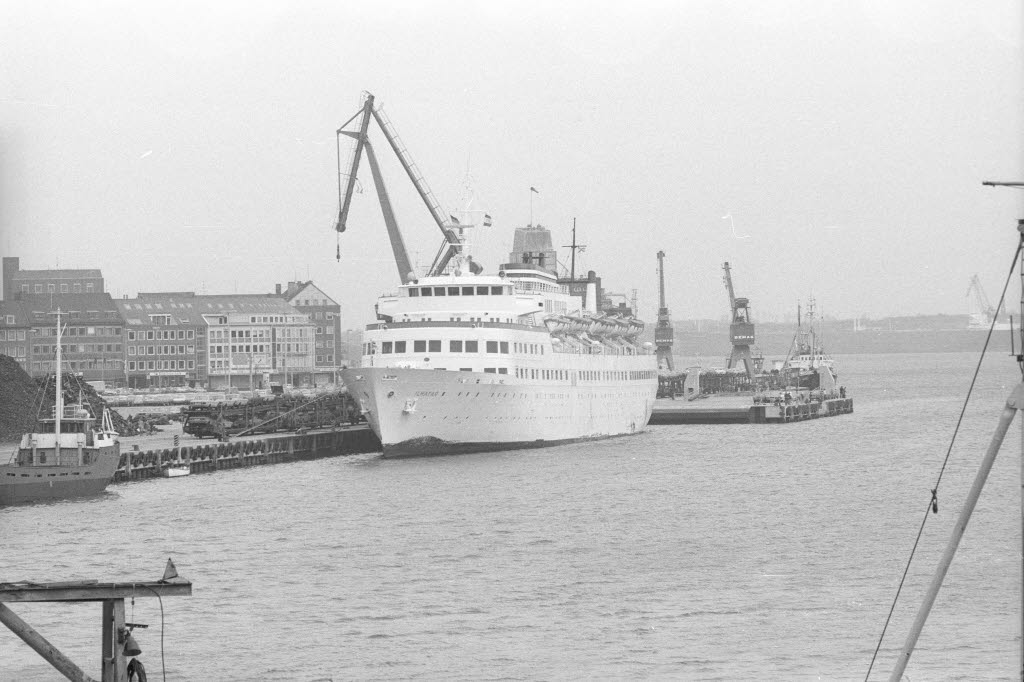
Ilmatar at Kiel.

Following delivery, the Ilmatar was used on traffic from Helsinki or Turku to Skeppsbron in Stockholm. In July of the same year she lost her rudder near Mariehamn. During 1965 she was also used on short cruises from Stockholm to Mariehamn in Åland. The Ilmatar's traffic was suspended during the winter of 1966 for two weeks due to thicker than usual sea ice in the North Baltic. Traffic ceased on 16 February 1966, when the Ilmatar was left in Turku. Traffic could recommence at the end of the month, when the Karhu was able to break a route through the ice to Stockholm.

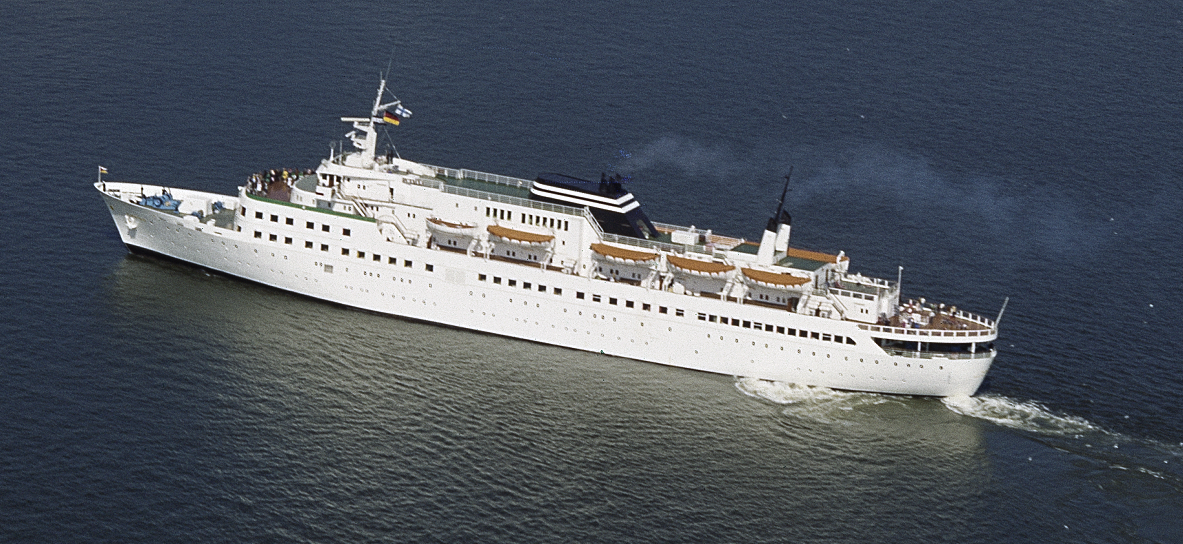
Ilmatar at Helsinki in 1973.

On 28 November 1968 the Ilmatar was en route from Stockholm to Turku in heavy fog with 177 passengers on board. She was scheduled to pass Botnia of Siljavarustamo near Långnäs, Åland around 2 AM. Both ships were in radar and radio contact with each other and their captains agreed on where and when the ships would pass each other. Despite the precautions, the ships collided at 2:12 am, after the Botnia had accidentally drifted to the wrong side of the shipway. Due to the heavy fog, visual contact was not established until five seconds before the collision. The Ilmatar's bow hit the Botnia's starboard side in a 40° angle, tearing a 40-meter gash on the Botnia and destroying eight cabins. One crew member and two passengers of the Botnia were killed instantly, while seven passengers were seriously injured and three of them died later on. The Ilmatar's bow was entirely destroyed but no people on board here were seriously injured. She was able to continue to Turku under her own power, and re-entered service after repairs on 8 December 1968. The crew of the Ilmatar were found innocent of causing the accident.

In 1970 Finland SS Co, Bore and Svea restructured their joint operations, creating a new marketing company Silja Line. As a result, the Ilmatar came to be marketed as a Silja Line vessel and logos of the new company were painted on her sides. In 1973 she was lengthened at HDW Hamburg. Following the lengthening, she was mainly used in Finland Steamship Company cruise traffic, and only occasionally for Silja Line service. In 1974–1975 she was used in Finland SS Co's Helsinki—Copenhagen—Travemünde service. In 1975 the company withdrew from the joint Finland—Germany service with Finnlines. As a result, the Ilmatar was chartered to Finnlines from 25 May 1975 until 6 July 1976 and used on the Helsinki—Copenhagen—Travemünde service. In 1976 Finland Steamship Company changed their name to Effoa. Following the end of charter to Finnlines, the Ilmatar was used by Effoa on cruise traffic aimed at the German and Finnish markets, with her itineraries taking her to the Baltic Sea, Norwegian Fjords and the Mediterranean.

From the beginning of 1978 the marketing of the Ilmatar's cruises was taken over by Silja Line, and Silja Cruise logos were painted on her superstructure. Her cruises were successful, and during the winter 1978–1979 she was rebuilt as a genuine cruise ship by Wärtsilä. Restrictions placed on cruise traffic by the Soviet Union, the long maritime strike of 1980 and following increased crew costs resulted in the decision to stop cruise service in June 1980. The Ilmatar returned briefly to Helsinki—Stockholm service for Silja Line, until she was sold on 27 October 1980 for $6.5 million to Vesteraalens Dampskibsselskab, one of the owners of the Hurtigruten consortium.

=== 1980–1984 ===
Vesteraalens Dampskibsselskab re-registered the Ilmatar in the Norwegian International Shipregister, but kept her original name and initially even Effoa funnel colours, although these were later changed to those of Vesteraalens Dampskibsselskab. The ship was used for cruising around Europe until 27 November 1982, when she was laid up at Toulon, France.

=== 1984–1997 ===
After being laid up for over a year, the Ilmatar was sold to Grunstad Maritime Overseas, renamed Viking Princess and re-flagged to Panama. Initially the Viking Princess was used for cruising from San Diego, California to Mexico in Crown Cruise Line colours from April 1984 until November 17, 1985, when she was moved to cruising from West Palm Beach to the Caribbean. Following the bankruptcy of her owners, the Viking Princess was laid up in October 1995.

=== 1997–2015 ===
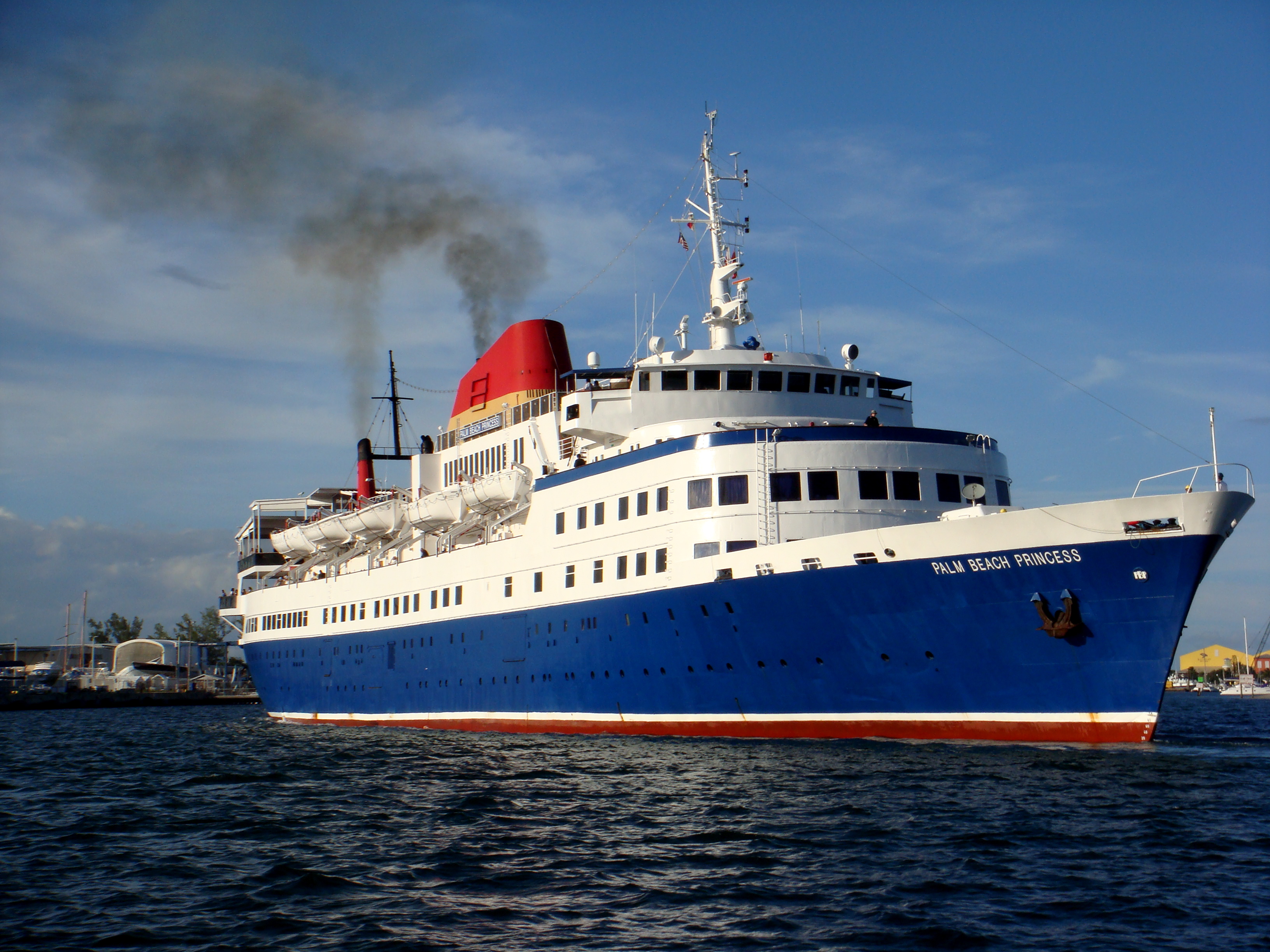
Palm Beach Princess in 2007.

In November 1997 the Viking Princess was sold to Deerbroke Invest, renamed Palm Beach Princess and used for casino cruising out of West Palm Beach in the colours of Palm Beach Casino Line. Her ownership changed several times during the following years, but she continued cruising on the same route in the same colours. The ship generally operated twice daily gambling cruises to nowhere for over the next 12 years.

By the end of 2009, trouble began to mount for the ship and the cruise line. The ship had suffered mechanical problems with its main engine, forcing it to use its auxiliary engines and rely on tugboats to enter and exit the port per the direction of the US Coast Guard. The staff and crew had rioted over pay issues. And the cruise line was under a backlog of debt due to missed voyages because of the mechanical failures. By early 2010, the cruise line ceased further cruises and was looking into bringing in a replacement ship.

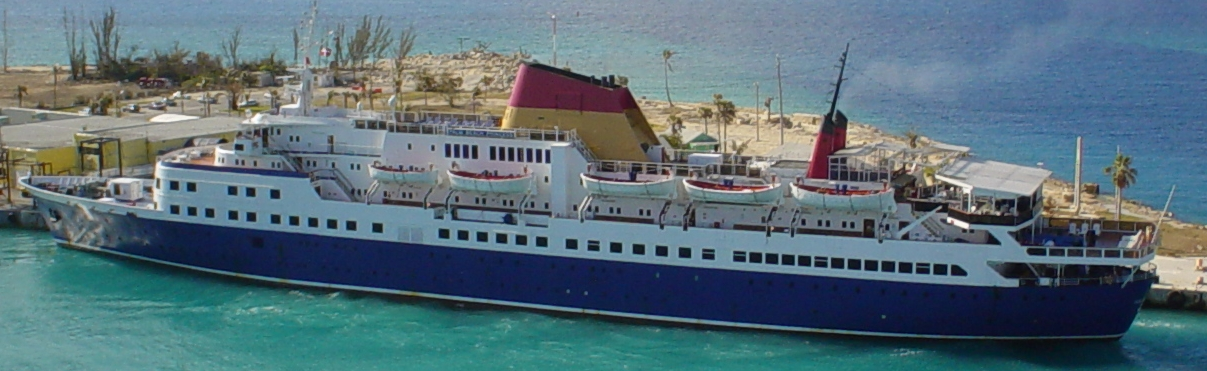
Palm Beach Princess at Freeport in 2006.

In February 2010, General Manager Greg Karan announced a potential deal to turn the ship into a floating hotel in Haiti for relief workers. Company officials claim that this plan is meant to shore up financing so that the ship could be replaced, but workers feared that it was a ploy to force them to buy their own tickets home. As of February 17 the ship had stopped sailing. Fearing that the workers and ship would be dumped in Haiti will little recourse, the Overseas Workers Welfare Administration paid for 44 Filipino workers to fly to the Philippines aboard Philippine Airlines flight PR103 from Miami. They were the last of the original crew and are still owed wages. They were making $400 per month.

On April 7, 2010, the ship left the Port of Palm Beach and headed for Freeport, Bahamas with its final destination then unknown. There was a skeleton crew of 19 on board. They had refused to leave due to unpaid wages and the chief financial officer brought cash payments of the wages. The ship's propellers then refused to turn and the ship was pushed out to sea by tugboats.

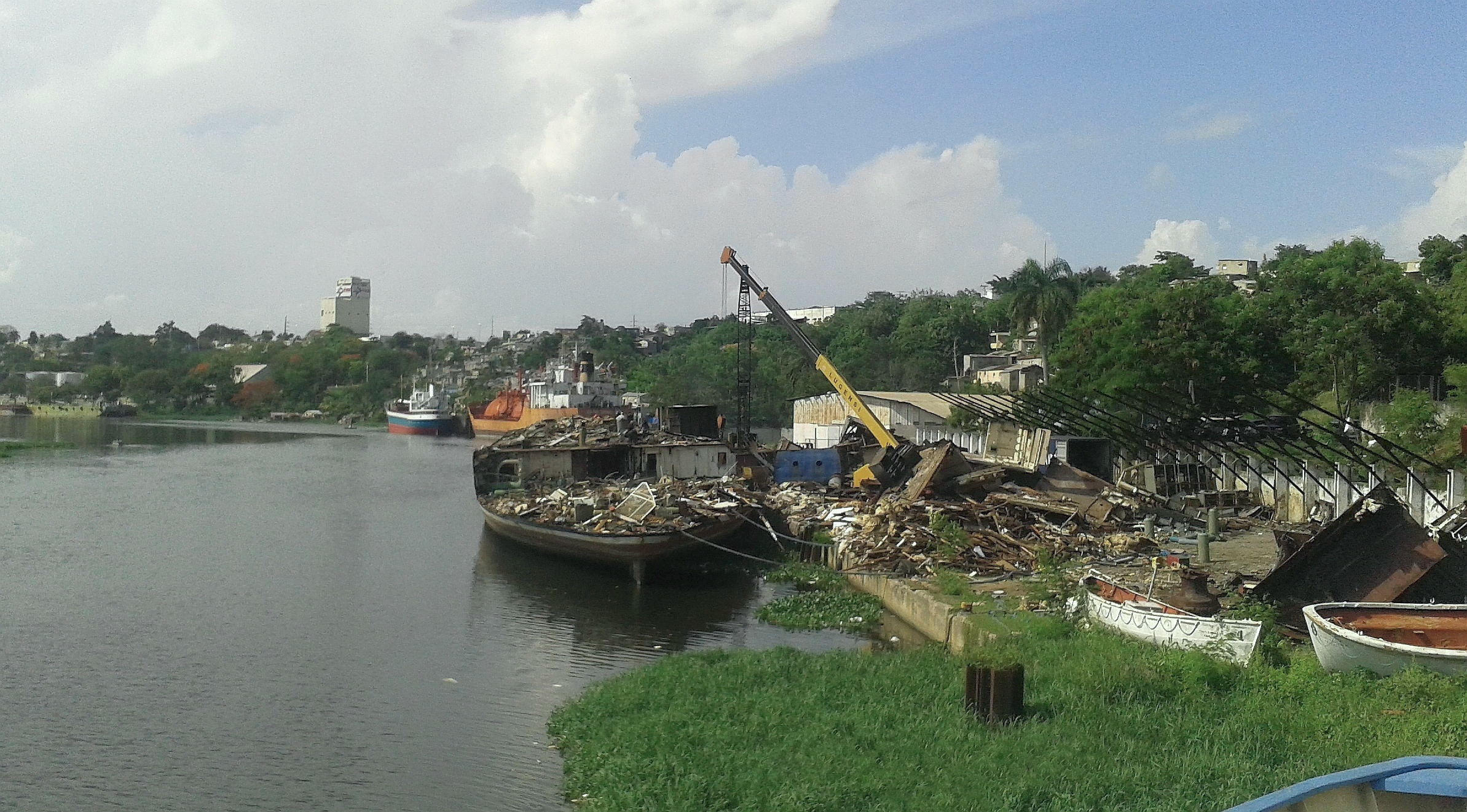
The scrapping of Palm Beach Princess.

In November 2011, shortly after she was sold to Imperial Ships LLC headquartered in La Paz, Bolivia, the ship was reportedly sold for scrap.

In February 2014, a report came in stating that the ship did not get scrapped, and had been laid up for some time at a scrapyard in Santo Domingo, Dominican Republic. According to Google Earth satellite pictures, the ship was laid up in Santo Domingo, with demolition of the ship evident starting in late 2014. Later photos on a ship spotting site confirmed the ship was indeed being scrapped. The ship was fully dismantled sometime in late 2015.

== Design ==
=== Exterior design ===
The Ilmatar was originally built with a yacht-like external appearance, with a sleek raked bow and a rounded stern. In keeping with the ferry design of the day she did not have a traditional funnel, but two slim exhaust pipes at near the back of the superstructure. The bridge was located on a separate deck on top of the superstructure, almost amidship. A half-arch shaped dummy "funnel" was attached to the back of the bridge structure, and the Finland Steamship Company colours were painted there.

The 1973 lengthening altered the ship's external appearance. The 20.04 m (65 ft 9 in) extension meant she lost her yacht-like looks and now appeared more like a liner. In addition to the lengthening, new spaces were built behind the bridge, which meant the removal of her original stylised dummy funnel. A new, large but low dummy funnel was built on the top and behind the added top deck structure. Her rear sun deck was also slightly extended.

When the Ilmatar became the Viking Princess, the dummy funnel was heightened to almost twice its original height. At some point during her career as Viking Princess the ship's rear sun deck was radically extended with the addition of a two-level overhanging structure.

=== Interior design ===
The Ilmatar's original interior layout was a compromise between the traditional two-class passenger liner and the new ro-ro car/passenger ferry. In order to transport cars, she was fitted with a gate on the port side, from where cars were driven inside the ship and then lifted mechanically to the actual car deck. This arrangement was already out of date when the ship was delivered, as Finland SS Co.'s subsidiary Siljavarustamo had taken the delivery of the first ro-ro ferry with bow and rear gates on the North Baltic already in 1961. An extra cardeck was added on the ship coinciding with the 1973 lengthening, but that too was served by the side gate and a lift.

Although the Ilmatar was built as a two-class ship, she had only one dining room that was used by both classes. Other facilities included a first-class smoking room, located one deck higher from the dining room. As built she had six passenger-accessible decks. The 1973 lengthening saw the addition of several new cabins, a children's playroom and a new waste processing plant. More cabins were added during a 1974 refit at the Valmet shipyard in Vuosaari. In the 1979 conversion into a cruise ship more luxurious cabins were added and a swimming pool was constructed on the rear deck.
