= MV Gemini =

Cruise ship built in 1992

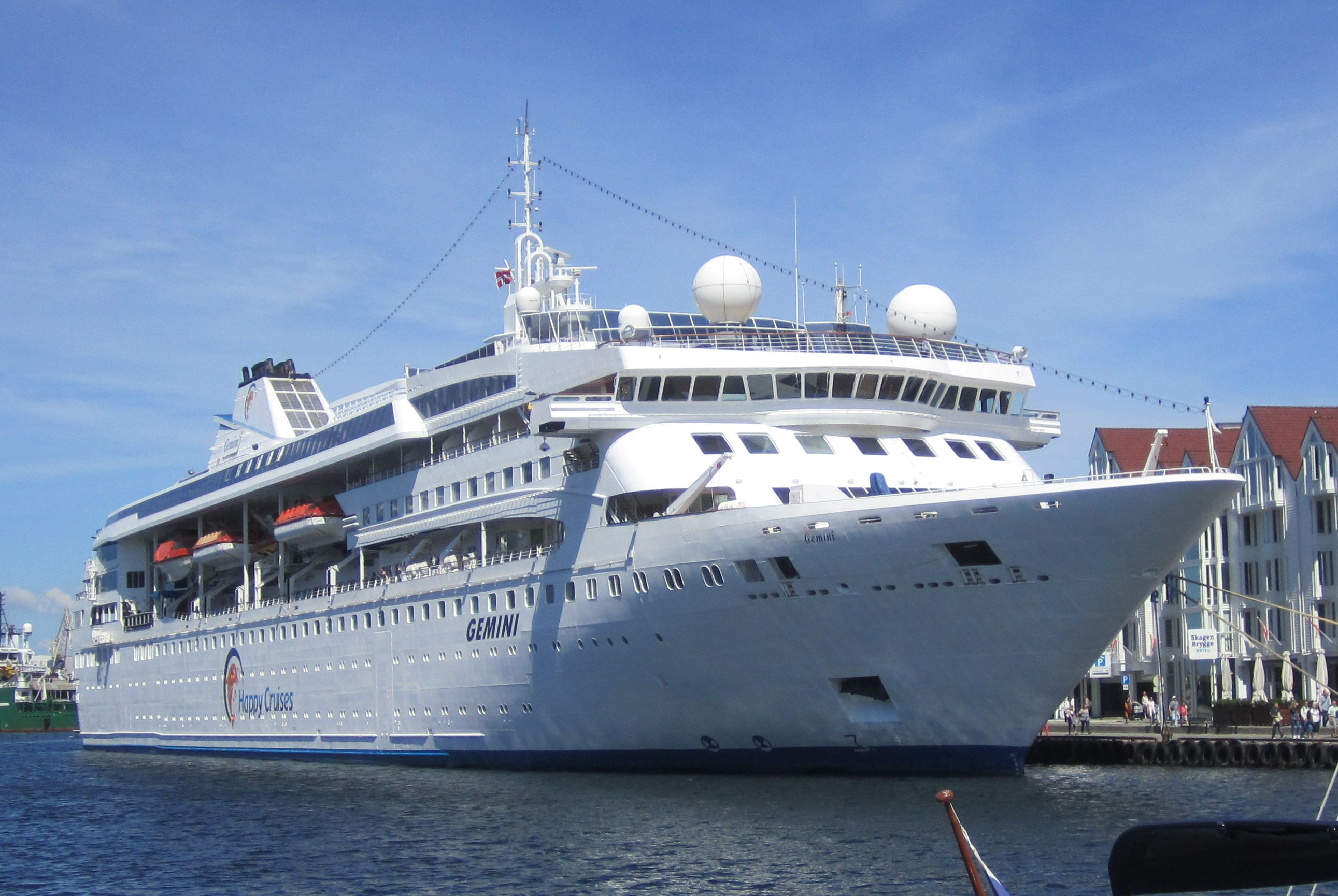
- Gemini in Stavanger, 2011

History
- Name: 1992-1993: Crown Jewel; 1993-1995: Cunard Crown Jewel; 1995-2009: Superstar Gemini; 2009-2009: Vision Star; 2009-2016: Gemini; 2016-2017: Celestyal Nefeli; 2017-present: Gemini
- Owner: 1992–1995: Crown Cruise Line; 1995–2009: Star Cruises; since 2009: Jewel Owner
- Operator: 1992–1993: Crown Cruise Line; 1993–1995: Cunard; 1995–2009: Star Cruises; 2009–2016: Quail Travel Group; 2016–2017: Celestyal Cruises; 2019-present: Miray Cruises
- Port of registry: 1992–2009: Panama, Panama; 2009–2009: Valletta, Malta; 2010–2016: Majuro, Marshall Islands; 2016–onwards: Nassau, Bahamas
- Route: Eastern Mediterranean
- Builder: Union Naval de Levante, Valencia
- Yard number: 197
- Launched: 30 May 1991
- Completed: 20 July 1992
- In service: 20 July 1992
- Identification: Call sign: C6AY8; IMO number: 9000687; MMSI number: 311000160
- Status: In service

General characteristics
- Type: Motor Vessel
- Tonnage: 19,093 GT
- Length: 163.81 m (537 ft 5 in)
- Beam: 22.5 m (73 ft 10 in)
- Draught: 5.40 m (17 ft 9 in)
- Installed power: 4 x Wärtsilä 8R32 diesel engines
- Propulsion: 2 × Controllable pitch propellers; 2 × bow thrusters
- Speed: 19 knots (35 km/h; 22 mph)
- Capacity: 1,074 passengers

MV Gemini is a cruise ship operated by Miray Cruises since 2019. She was built in 1992 by Unión Naval de Levante, Valencia, Spain for Crown Cruise Line as Crown Jewel. She has also sailed under the name Cunard Crown Jewel. She also operated as SuperStar Gemini for Star Cruises from 1995 to 2008.

== History ==
Crown Jewel was built in 1992 for Crown Cruise Line, a subsidiary of EffJohn, which was itself the merger of Finland Steamship Company and Johnson Line. The vessel is the largest cruise ship built in Spain. Crown Cruise Line used the ship for cruises from the United States to Canada, Bermuda and the Caribbean. In 1993, Cunard signed a deal to handle marketing, sales and reservations for Crown Cruise Line, and the vessel was renamed Cunard Crown Jewel. In 1995 the ship was sold to Star Cruises, renamed SuperStar Gemini, and placed on cruise traffic from Singapore. In February 1997 the ship suffered an engine room fire.

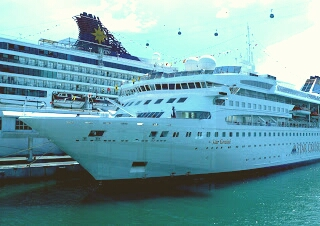
Superstar Gemini

In September 2007 Star Cruises reported that SuperStar Gemini had been sold and left the company fleet in December 2008. Reportedly the buyer was Jewel Owner Ltd., a Bahamas-based company in the Danish Clipper Group, which would charter the ship to a new operator in 2009. In 2008, Clipper announced that it would rename the ship Vision Star and lease the ship to the Spanish cruise ship operator, Vision Cruises. In March 2009, Vision Cruises ceased operations. In early 2009, Mediterranean Classic Cruises (formerly Monarch Classic Cruises) was booking cruises in the Aegean Sea aboard Vision Star. However, these cruises were cancelled due to the non-availability of Vision Star from Vision Cruises. Instead, SuperStar Gemini was renamed Gemini, and had a Spanish operator, Quail Travel Group.

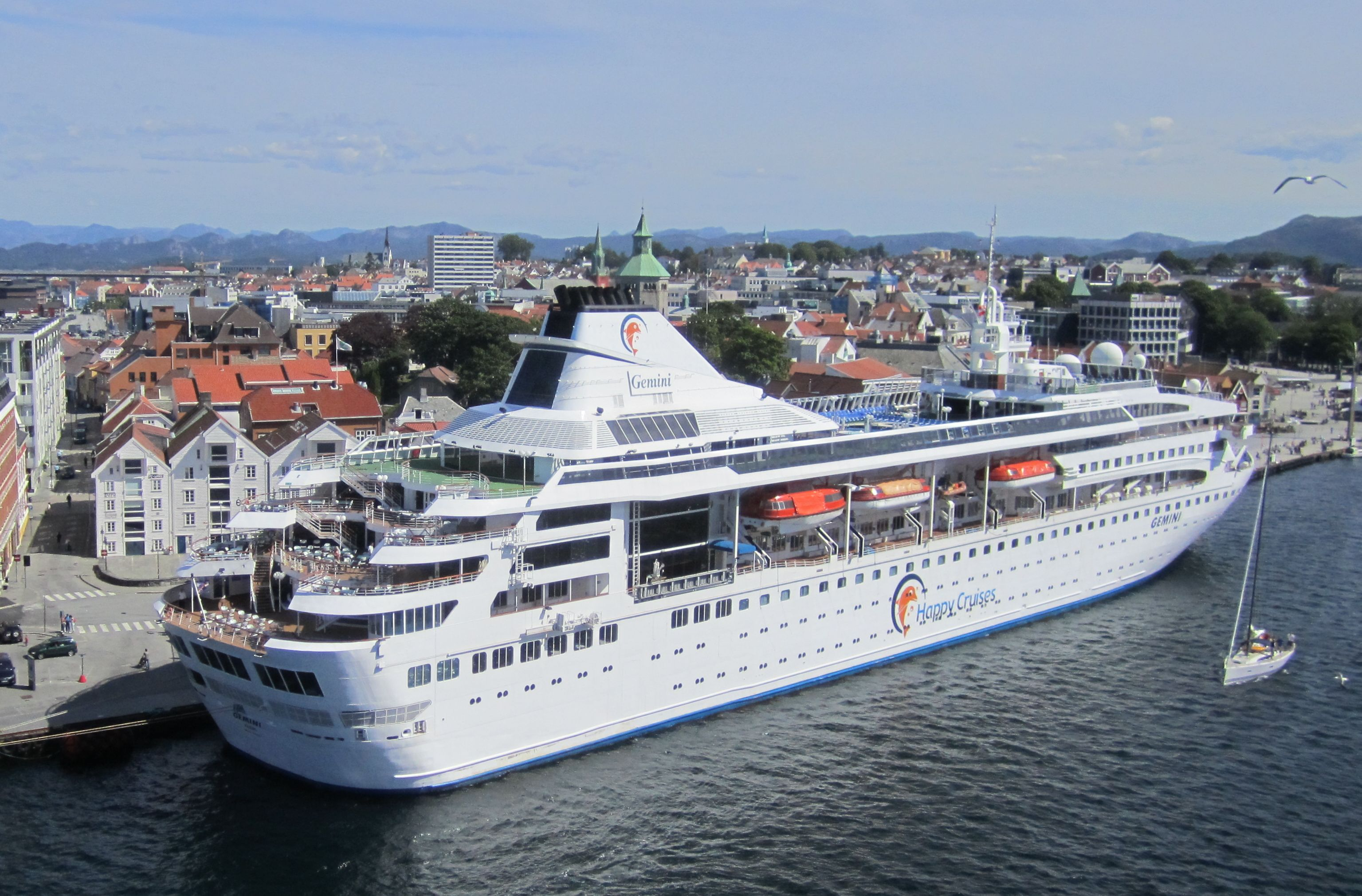
Gemini with Happy Cruises, Stavanger 2011

After the bankruptcy of Quail in 2011, Gemini was laid up in Tilbury Docks, England awaiting sale or charter.

== Cruises to 2015 ==
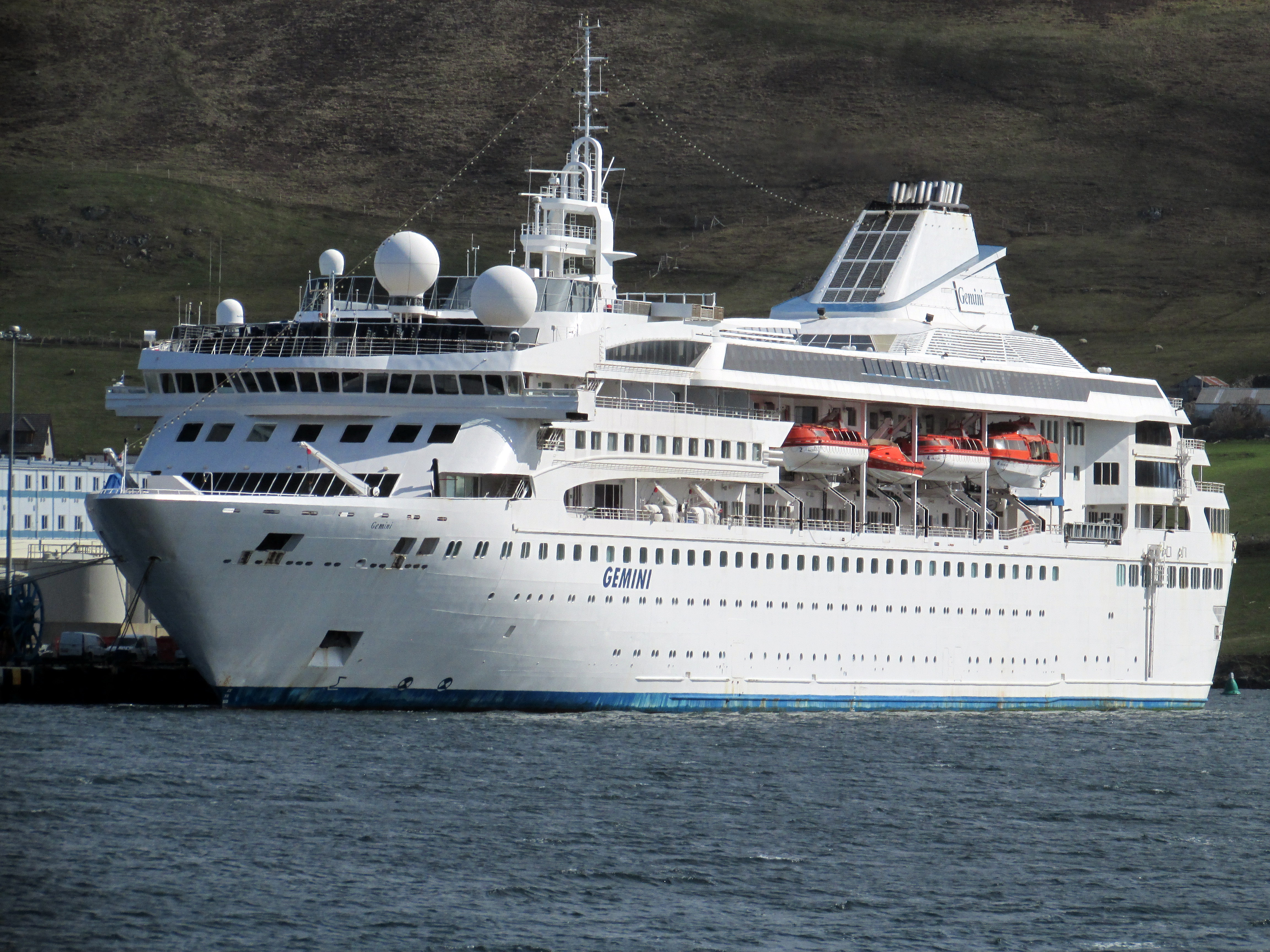
Gemini with Petrofac, Scalloway 2015

SuperStar Gemini was based in Singapore and she cruised to various destinations year round in the South China Sea, Gulf of Thailand, and Straits of Malacca. Superstar Gemini embarked on a three-month voyage around the Pacific including a full circumnavigation of the Australian continent and visited various cities e.g. Melbourne, Sydney, Fremantle, Brisbane, Komodo and Bali between November 2007 and February 2008.

For her final 2008 season for Star Cruises after returning from her Australian deployment, the ship was sailing a combination of Straits of Malacca seven-day cruises and six 21-day roundtrips from Singapore via Koh Samui, Laem Chebang, Ho Chi Minh City, Da Nang, Hong Kong, Halong Bay, Nha Trang, Kota Kinabalu and Kuching, then returning to Singapore.

SuperStar Gemini's last voyage for Star Cruises departed Singapore for a seven-day cruise to the Straits of Malacca on 28 December 2008, returning to the Singapore Cruise Centre on 4 January 2009. On the same day she sailed for Port Klang, and was subsequently refitted and delivered to new owners.

MV Gemini had a Spanish operator, Quail Travel Group (trading as "Happy Cruises"), and from November 2010 was sailing in the Caribbean, based in Havana, and including stops in Cozumel, Grand Cayman and Paradise Island. From May to October 2011 Gemini was scheduled to cruise in the Mediterranean, with stops in, amongst others, Venice, Athens and Istanbul. Due to Happy Cruises ceasing operations on 24 September 2011, she had to terminate her cruise at Valencia, Spain.

Clipper Ship Management, who followed as owner of Gemini and Ocean Pearl, issued a statement saying that both ships would be available for sale or charter. Following a strike by her crew at Gibraltar, on 25 October 2011 Gemini was again berthed in Tilbury Docks. During the London 2012 Olympic and Paralympic Games Gemini was used as temporary accommodation to house G4S games security staff, berthed Albert Dock.

Gemini was chartered to Petrofac, which was building an £800 million gas plant for French company Total to accommodate around 400 workers. She arrived at Scalloway, Shetland, in the second week of July 2014, and berthed at Dales Voe until 15 November 2015. Later that month, the ship left Scalloway for Besiktas, south of Istanbul, for drydocking, maintenance and an extensive refit, prior to returning to cruising, as Celestyal Nefeli, in spring 2016. The ship was chartered to Celestyal Cruises, then of Cyprus.

== Cruises since 2015 ==
Gemini was based in the Eastern Mediterranean from mid-2016. In 2017, she was chartered by the Federal Emergency Management Agency (FEMA) to host emergency response crews responding to Hurricane Irma and Hurricane Maria in St. Thomas, U.S. Virgin Islands. In 2018 the charter with FEMA ended and Gemini returned to Europe. From June to September 2018 the vessel was in service with the Turkish tour agency Etstur, sailing from Çeşme to Turkish and Greek ports. In 2019 the cruise ship was chartered by Blue World Voyages and the following year laid up at Piraeus, Greece.

In 2021, the ship was chartered for several years by Miray Cruises, an offshoot of a Turkish travel company, for operation in the Aegean Sea and Sea of Marmara. That programme was interrupted in February 2023 by the catastrophic earthquake in Turkey and Syria, when she was deployed to provide accommodation for the homeless from the Hatay Province, accommodating mostly the elderly, sick or pregnant, and families with small children. In March 2023, it was announced that Gemini would commence a three-year "live aboard" round-the-world cruise in November, operated by Life at Sea Cruises, a subsidiary of Miray. However, in June, Life at Sea Cruises said that Gemini had been replaced for this cruise by another ship, Lara, reported to be AIDAaura. In November that ship was sold to Celestyal Cruises, and Miray was still trying to source a ship suitable for its subsidiary start up.

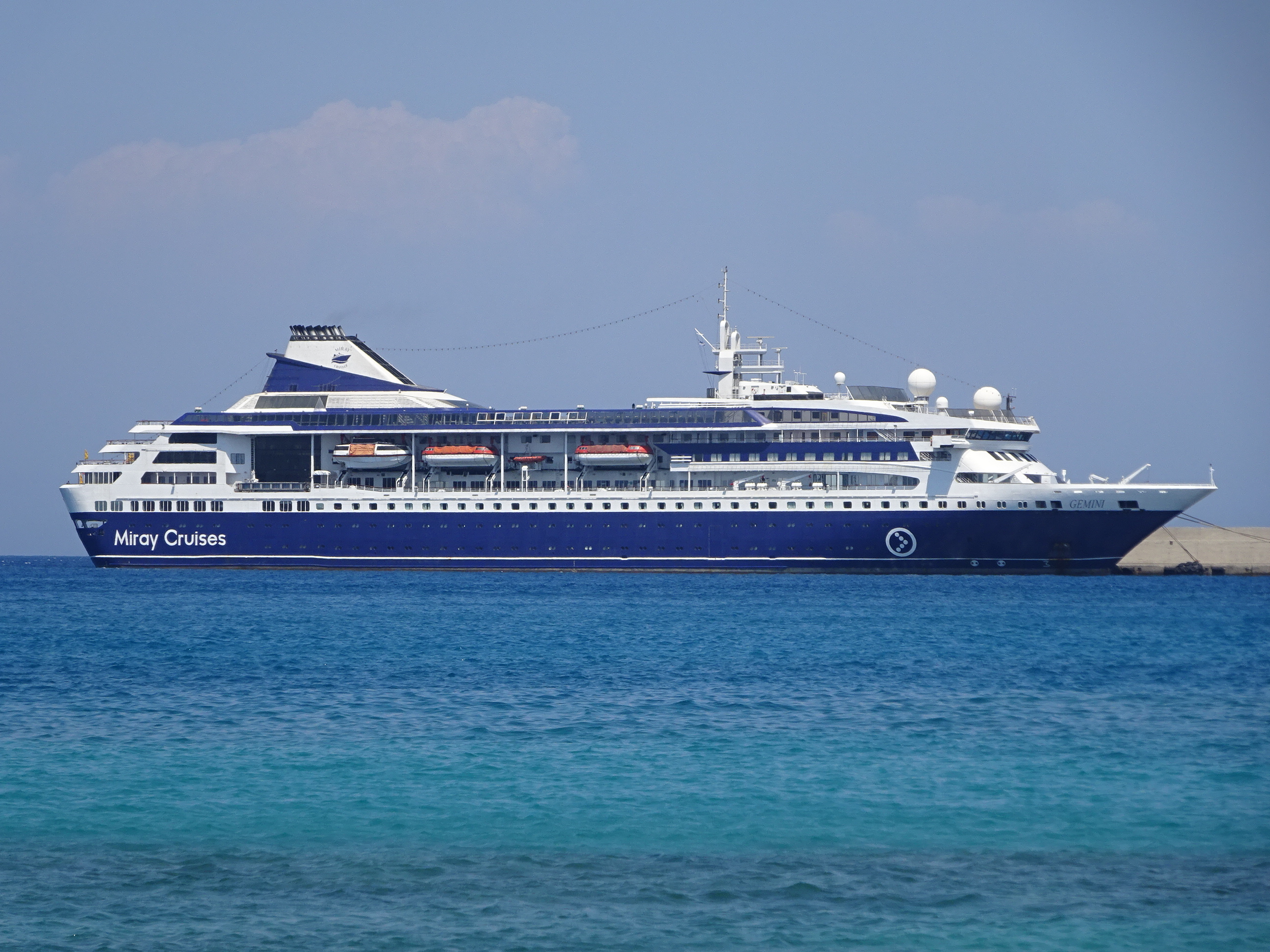
Gemini with Miray Cruises, Rhodes 2023

Due to a financial dispute between Miray and DenizBank, Gemini was declared abandoned in May 2026 at the port of Karystos, where it was seized by Greek authorities. The ship's crew of 26 were temporarily trapped on board, awaiting repatriation to their home countries under the Maritime Labour Convention. On 24 June 2026, it was towed to the port at Elefsina.

In November 2026 it will be put up for auction.
