= Miray Cruises =

Turkish cruise line

Miray International Cruises & Management
- Type: Private
- Industry: Hospitality and transportation
- Founded: 1996
- Headquarters: Sarıyer, Istanbul, Turkey
- Products: Cruises
- Owner: Vedat Uğurlu
- Website: miraycruises.com

Miray International Cruises & Management is a Turkish cruise line operator. After operating ships for other companies, Miray began operating its own cruises in 2021. In 2023, the company offered an unusual three-year, round-the-world cruise called "Life at Sea", but it was cancelled less than two weeks before the scheduled departure.

== History ==
Miray was founded in 1996. It provided management services for ships operated by other companies, such as the Turkish tour operator Etstur. The ships Miray helped manage included the Louis Aura, Aegean Paradise, MV Delphin, and Med Queen.

=== Mediterranean operations ===
In 2020, Miray announced that it would offer its own cruises in the Aegean Sea using the MV Gemini, which began sailing for Miray in 2021. The line's normal operations were interrupted in February 2023 by the catastrophic earthquake in Turkey and Syria; Gemini was deployed to provide accommodation for the homeless from Hatay Province. It accommodated mostly the elderly, sick, pregnant and families with small children.

Due to a financial dispute between Miray and DenizBank, the Gemini was declared abandoned in May 2026 at the port of Karystos, where it was seized by Greek authorities. The ship's crew of 26 were temporarily trapped on board, awaiting repatriation to their home countries under the Maritime Labour Convention. On 24 June 2026, it was towed to the port at Elefsina.

=== Life at Sea Cruises ===
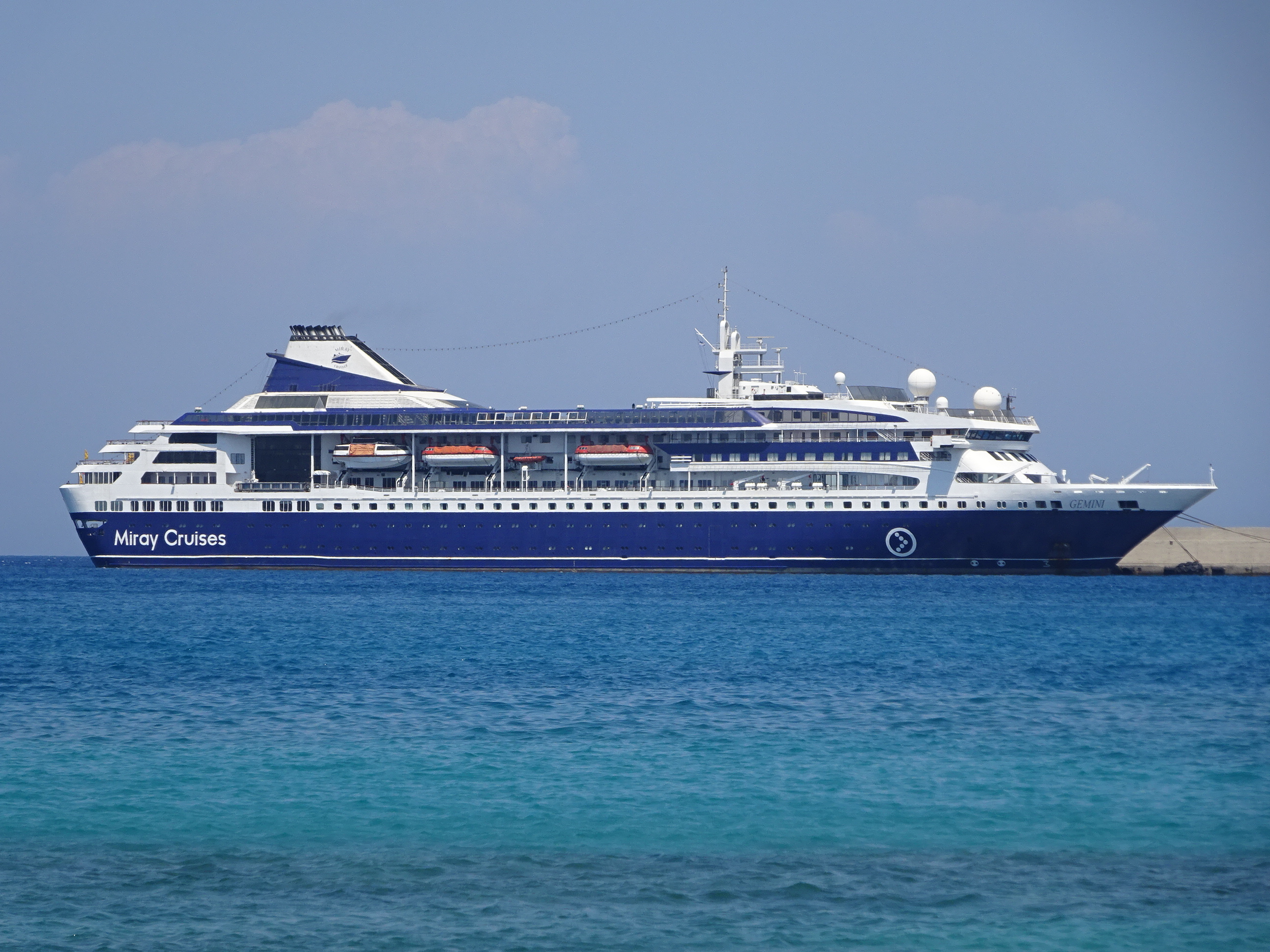
MV Gemini

In March 2023, Miray announced that Gemini would commence a three-year "live aboard" round-the-world cruise in November, under the brand "Life at Sea Cruises". The voyage was expected to include 382 ports in 140 countries. In May, following internal disputes about the safety of using Gemini for the extended voyage, 22 members of the Life at Sea team resigned, including its senior management.

Miray announced in June that it would replace Gemini for the world cruise with a different ship, reported to be AIDAaura, an AIDA Cruises ship that was being decommissioned. The ship would be renamed Lara and undergo renovations in Istanbul. The company also announced the promotion of Kendra L. Holmes as chief executive officer, including oversight of Life at Sea. Holmes met with AIDA's parent company, the Carnival Corporation, in September to close the purchase of AIDAaura. During the meetings, she was informed by Miray owner Vedat Uğurlu that the funds needed for the purchase were not available. The ship was instead purchased by Celestyal Cruises.

Miray delayed the Life at Sea departure twice, first from 1 November to 11 November, and then to 30 November. CEO Holmes left the company in mid-November; after resigning she sent a video on 17 November informing passengers that the cruise was cancelled. Miray confirmed the cancellation two days later, after some customers had already come to Istanbul in preparation for the cruise.

Some prospective passengers had sold or rented out their homes in expectation of living on the ship. Miray initially promised refunds and some coverage of travel expenses for customers, to be paid in three installments starting in December, but by January 2024 most customers had not received any refunds and Miray extended the expected refund timeframe to start in February. In January, a group of 78 prospective passengers sent a letter to Markenzy Lapointe, the United States attorney for the Southern District of Florida, requesting a criminal investigation of Miray's handling of Life at Sea.
