= MV Narrative =

Planned luxury residential ocean liner project

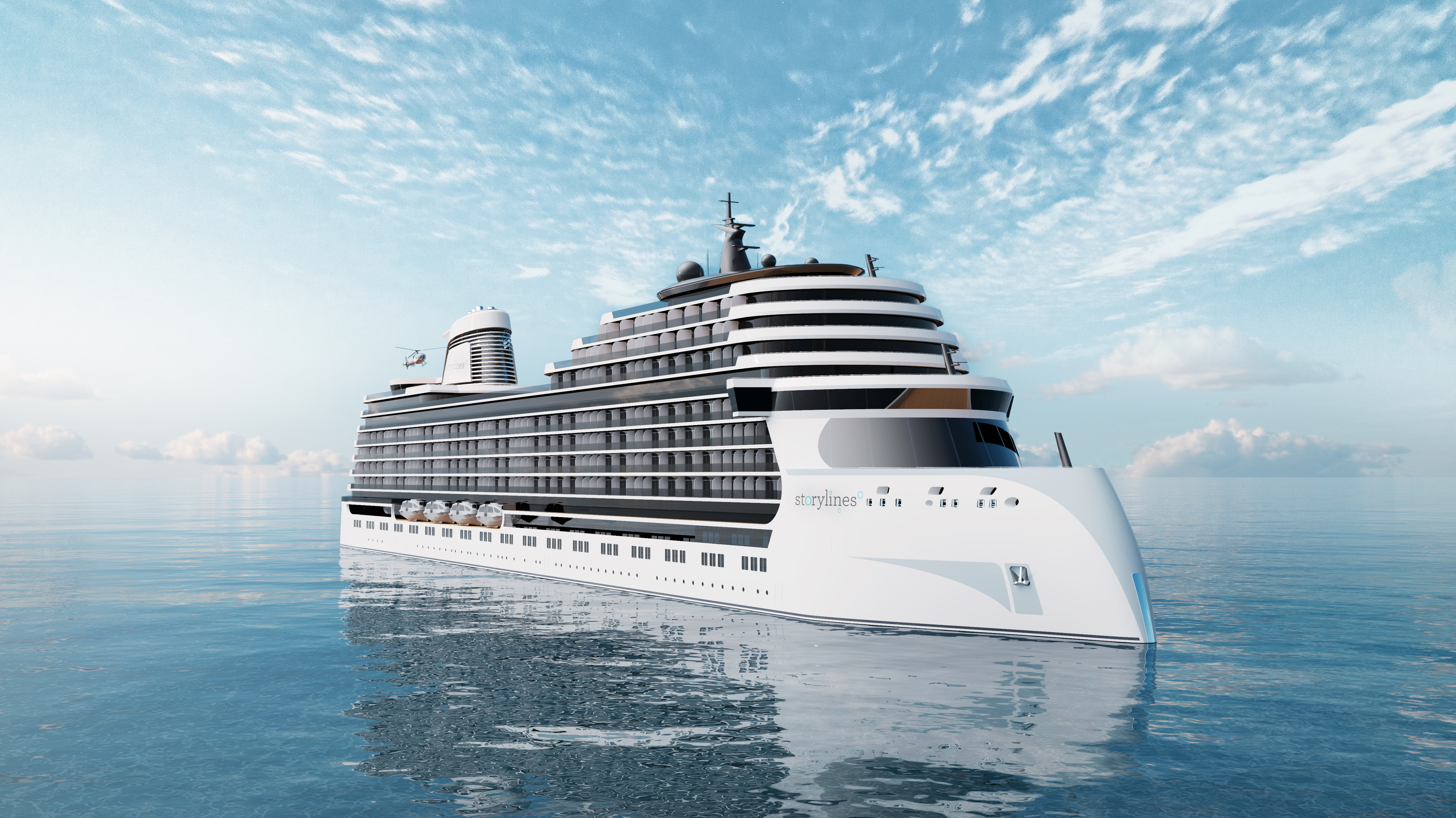
- Storylines' private residence ship MV Narrative

History
- Name: Narrative
- Operator: Storylines Global Inc.
- Port of registry: Nassau, Bahamas
- Route: Worldwide
- Ordered: August 2022
- Builder: Brodosplit Shipyard - Split, Croatia
- Yard number: 570
- In service: 2027
- Status: Design phase

General characteristics
- Type: Residential cruise ship
- Tonnage: 78,513 GT
- Length: 233.6 m (766 ft 5 in)
- Beam: 30 m (98 ft 5 in)
- Decks: 16
- Installed power: Liquefied natural gas (LNG) Hybrid
- Speed: 23 knots (43 km/h; 26 mph)
- Capacity: 1,475
- Crew: 450

MV Narrative is a planned residential cruise ship that will be owned by the Miami-based company Storylines. It is anticipated to be launched in 2027 from Croatia.

The vessel's design consists of 530 residences and various amenities. It is designed to sail to six continents, allowing residents to use their units as temporary or permanent homes. Units range from one to four bedrooms, most with balconies, and are available in coastal or contemporary interior designs. The ship is expected to feature twenty restaurants and bars, a microbrewery, three pools, a bowling alley, fitness and medical facilities, and other amenities. A youth education program is slated to be provided for children on board. All-inclusive fees, which cover housekeeping, gratuities, laundry service, meals, and Wi-Fi, are expected to be mandatory.

== Construction ==
Storylines signed a construction contract with Brodosplit Shipyard in Split, Croatia, to build MV Narrative, which will be powered by liquefied natural gas (LNG). The contract with Brodosplit Shipyard was renewed in March 2024, with the ship's design progressing in preparation for construction.
